= India national football team results (unofficial matches 2000–present) =

This is a list of the India national football team's results from 2000 to the present day that, for various reasons, are not accorded the status of official International A Matches.

Key
Win
Draw
Defeat

Note: The following list may not be complete

== 2000s ==
18 July 2000 Friendly	Fulham (England)	2–0	India	London, England
	Riedle 40', 81'	Report		Stadium: Craven Cottage; Attendance: 6,000

26 July 2000 Friendly	West Bromwich Albion (England)	0–0	India	West Bromwich, England
		Report		Stadium: The Hawthorns; Attendance: 11,090; Referee: Mick Fletcher

15 January 2001 Millennium Super Soccer Cup	India	0–3	Uruguay B	Kochi
17:30 IST		Report	Selages 38'; Varela 58'; Martirena 74'	Stadium: Jawaharlal Nehru Stadium; Referee: G. C. Deshapriya (Sri Lanka)

22 June 2001 2001 Merdeka Tournament	Malaysia U-23	2–1	India	Malaysia
19.00 IST	Indra Putra Mahayuddin 46'; Mohd Nizaruddin Yusof 74'	Report	Jules Alberto 85'

22 June 2001 2001 Merdeka Tournament	India	0–2	Thailand U-23	Malaysia
19.00 IST		Report	Manit Noyvach 17'; Nirut Surasiang 71'

26 Jun 2001 Friendly	India	0–0	United Arab Emirates	Kuala Lumpur
		Report

22 October 2003 Group-stage Afro-Asian Games	India	3–1	Rwanda	Hyderabad
	I.M Vijayan 13'; Muttah Suresh 54'; Ashim Biswas 61'	Report	Aziz balinda

24 October Group stage Afro-Asian Games	India	2–0	Malaysia U-21	Hyderabad
	J. S. Bisht 50'; I. M. Vijayan 64'	Report

29 September 2003 Semi-final	India	5–3	Zimbabwe	Hyderabad
		Report

31 September 2003 Final	India	0–1	Uzbekistan U-21	Hyderabad
		Report

27 August 2004 LG Cup Semifinal	South Korea University XI	4–0	India	Ho Chi Minh City, Vietnam
		Report		Stadium: Thống Nhất Stadium

5 July 2008 Friendly	Gouveia Select (Portugal)	0–2	India	Gouveia, Portugal
		Report	Lawrence; Ahmed

9 July 2008 Friendly	Gafanha (Portugal)	2–3	India	Gouveia, Portugal
		Report	Singh; Chhetri; Ahmed

12 July 2008 Friendly	Gouveia XI (Portugal)	0–4	India	Gouveia, Portugal
		Report	Yadav; Chhetri; Ahmed

== 2010s ==
28 July 2010 Friendly	Caldas (Portugal)	1–4	India	Portugal
		Report	Yadav 7'; Dias 16'; Pradeep 38'	Stadium: Pilado Ground

18 August 2010 Friendly	Serra (Portugal)	1–3	India	Portugal
		Report	Chhetri 35', 75'; Sushil 46'	Stadium: Pope John Paul II stadium Fatima

19 August 2010 Friendly	Mafra (Portugal)	1–0	India	Mafra, Portugal
		Report

25 August 2010 Friendly	Sertanense (Portugal)	2–3	India	Portugal
		Report	Chhetri; Pradeep	Stadium: Campo de Jogos Dr. Marques Santos

4 September 2010 Friendly	Al-Shaab (United Arab Emirates)	1–3	India	Sharjah, UAE
		Report	Chhetri 24', 26', 46'	Stadium: Khalid Bin Mohammed Stadium

18 July 2011 Friendly	Qatar	1–2	India	Doha, Qatar
	Ibrahim Khalfan 74'	Report	Chhetri 16' (pen.); S. Singh 73'	Stadium: Jassim Bin Hamad Stadium

10 January 2012 Audi Football Summit	India	0–4	(Germany) Bayern Munich	Nehru Stadium
18:00 local, 13:30 CET		Report	Gómez 14'; Müller 29', 37'; Schweinsteiger 43'	Attendance: 35,000; Referee: Santosh Kumar (India)

13 August 2016 Friendly	Bhutan	0–3	India	Thimphu, Bhutan
15:30		Report	Passi 3'; Lalpekhlua 18'; Narzary 21'	Stadium: Changlimithang Stadium; Referee: Yeshi Gyeltshen (Bhutan)

1 July 2019 Friendly	India Blue	2–2	India White	Mumbai, India
16:00	Udanta; Mandar	Report	Chhangte; Farukh	Stadium: Mumbai Football Arena; Attendance: 100

10 October 2019 Friendly	India	1–1	(India) NorthEast United	Guwahati, India
19:00	Chhetri 34'	Report	Gyan 44'	Stadium: Indira Gandhi Athletic Stadium; Attendance: 300

== 2020s ==
16 August 2021 Friendly	India	1–0	(India) West Bengal	Kolkata, India
	Mishra	Report		Stadium: Salt Lake Stadium

26 August 2021 Friendly	India	2–0	(India) Mohammedan	Kolkata, India
	Choudhary; Pandita	Report		Stadium: Salt Lake Stadium

11 May 2022 Friendly	India	1–2	(India) Mohun Bagan	Kolkata, India
	Chhetri	Report	Colaco 30'; Nassiri 37'	Stadium: Salt Lake Stadium

17 May 2022 Friendly	India	2–0	(India) I-League Stars	Kolkata, India
	Chhetri; Pandita	Report		Stadium: Kishore Bharati Krirangan

20 May 2022 Friendly	India	1–1	(India) West Bengal	Kolkata, India
	Samad 55'	Report	S. Singh	Stadium: Kishore Bharati Krirangan

13 November 2025 Friendly	India	6–1	Bhutan	Bengaluru, India
	V. P. Singh; Ali; Williams; Yumnam; Yadwad	Report	Karma Chetrim	Stadium: Padukone-Dravid Centre for Sports Excellence; Attendance: 0 (Closed Door)

== See also ==
- India national football team results (unofficial matches 1924–1947)
- India national football team results (unofficial matches 1948–1999)
- India national football team results (2020–present)
