= João Abel Manta =

Portuguese architect, painter and cartoonist (1928–2026)

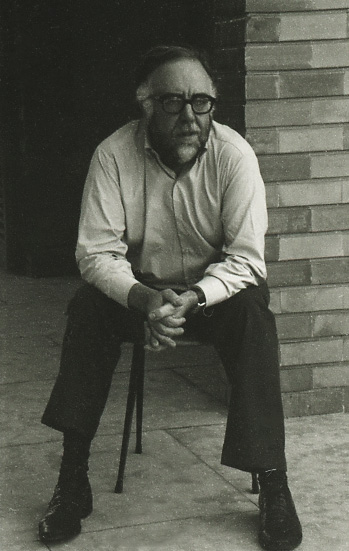
João Abel Manta in 1977

João Abel Manta (29 January 1928 – 15 May 2026) was a Portuguese architect, painter, illustrator and cartoonist.

== Life and career ==
João Abel Manta was born in Lisbon on 29 January 1928, the son of the painters Abel Manta and Maria Clementina Carneiro de Moura Manta. He was married to Maria Alice Ribeiro, by whom he has a daughter, Isabel. He lived and worked in Lisbon.

He graduated in architecture at the Lisbon Higher School of Fine Arts (1951), where he befriended Rolando Sá Nogueira and José Dias Coelho. From the outset he became integrated within the Lisbon intellectual set connected to the left-wing movements that were against the Fascist dictatorship of Salazar and Marcelo Caetano.

Manta won several Portuguese and international prizes, among which are the Drawing Prize at the Calouste Gulbenkian Foundation II Exhibition of Plastic Arts (1961), the Silver Medal at the International Exhibition of Graphic Arts, in Leipzig (1965) and the Stuart-Regisconta Prize in 1988.

He participated in a great many group exhibitions in Portugal and abroad; he has held many solo exhibitions, among which are: Galeria Interior, Lisbon, 1971; Institute of Contemporary Arts (ICA), London, 1976; Rafael Bordalo Pinheiro Museum, Lisbon, 1992; Cascais Cultural Centre, Cascais, 1999; and Palácio Galveias, Lisbon, 2009. A major retrospective was held at the Citadel of Cascais in 2021.

Manta died on 15 May 2026, at the age of 98.

== Work ==
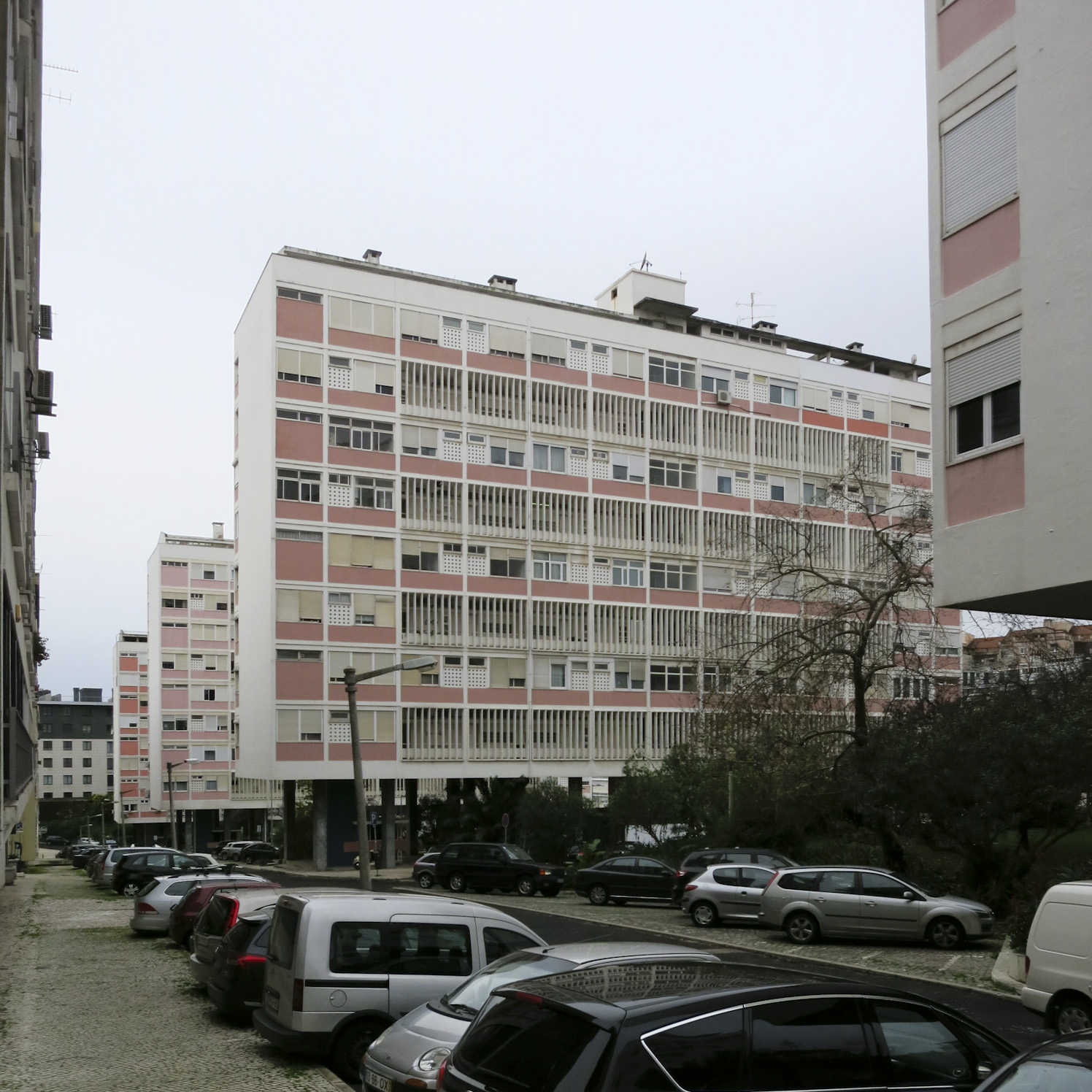
Apartment blocks, Avenida Infante Santo, Lisbon

He was responsible, along with Alberto Pessoa and Hernâni Gandra, for the project for the apartment blocks in the Avenida Infante Santo, Lisbon, for which he won the Municipal Architecture Prize (1957).

As a visual artist he has devoted himself to painting, ceramics, tapestry, mosaics, illustration, graphic arts and cartoons. He has designed stamps and posters, and illustrated books, among which is "A cartilha do marialva", by José Cardoso Pires. He is the author of the tapestries of the Noble Hall of the head premises of the Calouste Gulbenkian Foundation. Of particular note in the context of public art are the pavement in the Restauradores square, Lisbon, and the large tile panel in the Avenida Calouste Gulbenkian, Lisbon (designed in 1970 and applied 1982).

Manta is of particular importance in the area of the cartoon, and is considered by many to be "the most extraordinary case of Portuguese cartoon drawing of our century [20th century], only comparable [to] Bordalo Pinheiro himself". That facet covers a long period of his work, from approximately 1954 to 1991, being particularly intense between 1969 and 1976. For about seven years his works were published regularly in newspapers like the Diário de Lisboa, Diário de Notícias, and O Jornal, critically and deeply ironically dealing with Portuguese reality; in 1981 he published new works in the Jornal de Letras, but from then on his activity as a cartoonist became sporadic.

His cartoons marked the period before the Carnation Revolution with their unique and meticulous graphic quality: "No painter of today has summarised the social and political temperature of the death throes of Fascism with such subtlety". Almost everything fits into this "domestic inventory": "what is at stake are the disasters and the grotesques of a bourgeoisie, our own one, with its emblems and heroes". João Abel "points at History, at the monument and in particular at the provincial procession of our intellectual bourgeoisie".

His political intervention is intensified in 1974 and 1975, straight after the fall of the dictatorship, hurling himself into "the battle with redoubled keenness, multiplying himself in caricatures, posters and hoardings with a markedly revolutionary orientation", and becoming the "maximum artist, perhaps the only one, after all, that the April revolution called upon". He questioned the identity of a country in turmoil in drawings such as A Difficult Problem, where a group of outstanding figures from the past – from Karl Marx to Trotsky and Sartre – stare inquisitively at a small map of Portugal on a blackboard. João Abel Manta "will be associated in a very particular way to the best and worst that we lived through in Portugal during those years".

A Difficult Problem, 1975, Indian ink on paper, 37 x 62 cm

From 1976 on "the enlisted artist João Abel is eclipsed: the winds are different, the MFA (Armed Forces Movement) is dissolved", and it is only in 1978 that "he emerges from the silence and launches a […] new album: Caricatures of the Salazar Years ", in which he "narrates a story – our story […] in which the ridiculous and the tragedy of colonization and the colonial war, Miguelism and Liberalism […] popular submission and revolt […] local traditional music and crafts, the theatre, the cinema and painting […] fit together, alternate or are linked to each other".

From 1981 on he almost exclusively devotes himself to painting, in an intimate approach that contrasts with the socio-political intervention of his cartoons. In 2009 he exhibits at the Palácio Galveias: "In these works I practice an innocent type of oil painting, […] in order to explain to those who are interested what I think of the world and the things of the past and the present”.

My attraction […] for some impressionist artists derives from their remarkable use of the painting technique and perhaps also from the tranquility of their subject matter, a curious tranquility at a time of agitation and revolution: the intimacy of bourgeois life, relaxing landscapes, happy people, dancers". But his apparent formal proximity to impressionism is misleading, and in his paintings from the eighties to the two-thousands we can often see a somber universe from which emerge "unnamable and horrible figures, the products of hallucination". João Abel Manta’s disturbing view fuses "everyday life and the fantastic, in Lisbon landscapes invaded by strange beings, alongside a recurring presence of self-figurations that refer to a self-confessional territory hitherto unknown in his work.

== Bibliography ==
- COTRIM, João Paulo – João Abel Manta: Caprichos e desastres. Lisbon: Assírio & Alvim, 2008. ISBN 978-972-37-1352-7
- MANTA, João Abel – João Abel Manta: Cartoons. Lisbon: Edições O Jornal, 1975.
- MANTA, João Abel; SOUSA, Osvaldo - João Abel Manta: Gráfica. Lisbon: Grupo de Empresas Regisconta, 1988.
- MANTA, João Abel – João Abel Manta: obra gráfica. Lisbon: Museu Rafael Bordalo Pinheiro, 1992.
- MANTA, João Abel - Caricaturas portuguesas dos anos de Salazar. Oporto: Campo das Letras,1998. ISBN 972-610-137-9
- MANTA, João Abel – João Abel Manta, Pintura, 1991-2009. Lisbon: Câmara Municipal de Lisboa, 2009. ISBN 978-972-8543-14-3
