= India national football team results (unofficial matches 1924–1947) =

This is a list of the India national football team's results from 1924 to 1947 (pre-independence) that, for various reasons, are not accorded the status of official International A Matches. India competed as Calcutta Indians and Calcutta Wanderers during the initial years.

Key
Win
Draw
Defeat

Note: The following list may not be complete

== 1919 ==
17 April 1919 British Inter-Theatre of War Championship	Home Forces (United Kingdom)	2–0	India	Aldershot, England
	Thompson (pen.)	Report

25 April 1919 British Inter-Theatre of War Championship	India	1–0	Egypt	Aldershot, England
		Report

== 1924 ==
September 1924	Rangoon XI (British Raj)	0–1	(India) Calcutta Indians	Rangoon

24 September 1924	Singapore FA (Straits Settlements)	0–4	(India) Calcutta Indians	Singapore
			H. Bose 15'; Samad; R. Ganguly	Stadium: Anson Road Stadium; Referee: C. Salter

25 September 1924	Singapore Chinese FA (Straits Settlements)	0–1	(India) Calcutta Indians	Singapore
			M. Dutt	Stadium: Anson Road Stadium; Attendance: 10,000; Referee: R.H. Gale

28 September 1924	Hercules (Dutch East Indies)	0–2	(India) Calcutta Indians	Batavia
				Stadium: B.V.C.-veld, Weltevreden; Attendance: 20,000; Referee: W. van Galen

29 September 1924	Batavia FC (BVC) (Dutch East Indies)	0–1	(India) Calcutta Indians	Batavia
			P Chatterjee	Stadium: B.V.C.-veld, Weltevreden; Referee: J. Hetharia

2 October 1924	West Java FA (WJVB) (Dutch East Indies)	0–0	(India) Calcutta Indians	Batavia
				Stadium: B.V.C.-veld, Weltevreden; Referee: F.X.A. Drilling

5 October 1924	Hoogere Burger School (HBS) (Dutch East Indies)	1–0	(India) Calcutta Indians	Surabaya
	Cana			Stadium: T.H.O.R.-veld; Attendance: 10,000; Referee: Henny van Alphen

9 October 1924	Soerabaja FA (SVB) (Dutch East Indies)	0–1	(India) Calcutta Indians	Surabaya
				Stadium: T.H.O.R.-veld; Attendance: 6,000; Referee: Wegeman

13 October 1924	Hercules (Dutch East Indies)	2–1	(India) Calcutta Indians	Batavia
	Willy Galstaun		Chatterjee	Stadium: B.V.C.-veld, Weltevreden; Attendance: 20,000; Referee: W. van Galen

15 October 1924	Bandoeng FA (BVB) (Dutch East Indies)	0–0	(India) Calcutta Indians	Bandung
				Referee: Foltynski

17 October 1924	Sidolig (Dutch East Indies)	0–1	(India) Calcutta Indians	Bandung
			Samad	Referee: De Wilde

19 October 1924	North Java FA (NJVB) (Dutch East Indies)	1–2	(India) Calcutta Indians	Tegal
	Julius		M. Dutt; Samad

21 October 1924	Bandoeng FA (BVB) (Dutch East Indies)	5–1	(India) Calcutta Indians	Bandung
	De Jager 5', 20'; Middleton 10'; Giesel 41' ? 55' (o.g.)		?	Referee: Foltynski

== 1926 ==
20 October 1926	Duke of Wellington's (Straits Settlements)	5–2	(India) Calcutta Wanderers	Singapore
	Hawthorn 5'; Osborne; Basford		Samad (pen.); Rahman

21 October 1926	Singapore FA (Straits Settlements)	2–4	(India) Calcutta Wanderers	Singapore
	Chan Hee 5'; Wan Puteh		N. Gossain; T. Shome; T. Das

24 October 1926	Hercules (Dutch East Indies)	2–1	(India) Calcutta Wanderers	Batavia

26 October 1926	Semarang FA (VSO) (Dutch East Indies)	2–0	(India) Calcutta Wanderers	Semarang

28 October 1926	Bandoeng FA (BVB) (Dutch East Indies)	2–0	(India) Calcutta Wanderers	Bandung

30 October 1926	Oliveo (Dutch East Indies)	1–2	(India) Calcutta Wanderers	Batavia

31 October 1926	West Java FA (WJVB) (Dutch East Indies)	6–0	(India) Calcutta Wanderers	Batavia

3 November 1926	Hercules (Dutch East Indies)	2–1	(India) Calcutta Wanderers	Batavia

5 November 1926	Vios (Dutch East Indies)	2–1	(India) Calcutta Wanderers	Batavia

10 November 1926	Singapore Chinese FA (Straits Settlements)	3–0	(India) Calcutta Wanderers	Singapore
	? (o.g.); Un Sun

== 1933 ==
31 January 1933 Friendly	All Ceylon (British Ceylon)	0–1	IFA XI	British Ceylon
		Report	Bhattacharya	Referee: P. Gupta

3 February 1933 Friendly	De Mel League (British Ceylon)	0–1	IFA XI	British Ceylon
		Report		Stadium: NCC Ground; Attendance: 3,500

== 1934 ==
9 June 1934	Natal XI (South Africa)	0–6	India	Durban
		Report	Bhattacharya 1'; Ramanna	Stadium: Curries Fountain; Attendance: 10,000

11 June 1934	Natal XI (South Africa)	3–1	India	Pietermaritzburg
		Report

13 June 1934	Transvaal XI (South Africa)	1–7	India	Johannesburg
	A. Naidu	Report	Lakshminarayan; Ramanna	Stadium: Natalspruit Indian Sports Ground; Attendance: 4000

16 June 1934	Transvaal XI (South Africa)	1–6	India	Pretoria
	Govinder	Report	Bhattacharya; Lakshminarayan	Stadium: Caledonian Football Ground

1934	South Africa	0–2	India	Johannesburg
		Report		Attendance: 6,000

1934	South Africa	0–2	India	Durban
		Report

1934	Natal Sunday League XI (South Africa)	1–7	India	N/A
		Report

1934	Boards XI (South Africa)	0–9	India	N/A
		Report

1934	Eastern Province XI (South Africa)	1–6	India	N/A
		Report

1934	Western Province XI (South Africa)	1–3	India	Cape Town
		Report

7 July 1934	South Africa	1–4	India	Cape Town
	Adams	Report	Lakshminarayan; S. Chaudhuri; S. Dutt

1934	Nicualand (South Africa)	1–6	India	N/A
		Report

1934	Northern Natal (South Africa)	1–8	India	N/A
		Report

1934	Witwatersrand (South Africa)	0–1	India	N/A
		Report

1934	Kimberley Xi (South Africa)	n/a	India	N/A
		Report

1934	South Africa	n/a	India	Durban
		Report

== 1936 ==
4 July 1936 Friendly	India	1–1	China	Calcutta, India
	Noor Mohammed	Report	Suen Kam Shun	Stadium: Calcutta FC Ground; Attendance: 100,000

== 1938 ==
30 May 1938 Friendly	India	2–2	Burma	Calcutta, India
	Lakshminarayan		Pugsley	Stadium: Calcutta FC Ground; Referee: S Gosh (India)

August 1938	India	6–1	South Australia	Adelaide, Australia
	A. Nandi; Prosad; K. Bhattacharya			Stadium: Hindmarsh Oval; Attendance: 3,000

August 1938	India	1–4	(Victoria (state)) Victoria (Australia)	Melbourne, Australia
	K. Prosad			Stadium: Melbourne Cricket Ground

August 1938	India	4–6	New South Wales	Sydney, Australia
	Rahim			Stadium: Sydney Showground; Attendance: 25,000

August 1938	India	1–2	(Northern Territory) Northern Districts (Australia)	Cessnock, Australia
	Lumsden		Heeney	Stadium: Baddeley Park

5 September 1938	India	6–5	Queensland	Brisbane, Australia
	Rahim; Noor Mohammad Jr. A. Nandi; Lumsden; B. Sen; A. Premlal		Brittain (pen.)	Stadium: Brisbane Exhibition Ground; Attendance: 5,000

7 September 1938	India	5–2	(Queensland) Ipswich	Ipswich, Australia
	Noor Mohammad Jr. 10'; Lumsden 17', 90'; Rahim 40'		Donaldson	Stadium: North Ipswich Reserve; Attendance: 2,000

September 1938	India	5–2	Queensland	Toowoomba, Australia
	Lumsden (pen.); K. Bhattacharya 46'; Rahim 89'		Kitching; Young	Stadium: Athletic Oval

22 September 1938	India	6–4	(New South Wales) South Coast	New South Wales, Australia
	Rahim; S. Joseph		E. Love; Cunningham	Stadium: Balls Paddock, Woonona; Attendance: 4,000

28 September 1938	India	4–6	(New South Wales) Granville	New South Wales, Australia
	Noor Mohammad Jr. Lumsden 45'	Report	R.Sanders; Hextell; S McDonald	Stadium: Clyde Oval

8 October 1938	India	1–5	Western Australia	Perth, Australia
	S. Joseph 70'		W. Waddell 27', 45', 80', 87'; Conduit 60'	Stadium: WACA Ground; Attendance: 2,000

11 October 1938	India	3–1	Western Australia	Perth, Australia
				Stadium: WACA Ground; Attendance: 2,000

26 October 1938	India	3–1	(Sri Lanka) Madras XI	Madras, Ceylon
	Joseph; Chowdhury	Report	Jesudoos

== See also ==
- India national football team results (unofficial matches 1948–1999)
- India national football team results (unofficial matches 2000–present)
