= Church of Nossa Senhora da Assunção (Cascais) =

- Cascais Mother Church
- Igreja de Nossa Senhora da Assunção
- Church of Nossa Senhora da Assunção
- 38.6952°N 9.4211°W
- Location: Cascais
- Country: Portugal
- Denomination: Roman Catholic

History
- Founded: 1510-1525

Administration
- Parish: Nossa Senhora da Assunção e Ressurreição

The Church of Nossa Senhora da Assunção is the Mother Church of the city of Cascais, in the Lisbon district, of Portugal. Its date of construction is unknown but some internal decoration has been dated as being between 1520 and 1525 and the church is clearly visible in a 1572 engraving showing a view of Cascais from the sea.

== History ==
Nossa Senhora da Assunção is believed to have been constructed on the site of a Visigoth necropolis in the early 16th century. The church still has four painted panels from the first quarter of the 16th century, attributed to the Master of Lourinhã, which were probably part of an altarpiece. A 1572 engraving by Georgius Branius in the work "Civitates Urbius Terrarum" (1593 edition), shows the village of Cascais surrounded by a wall with the church outside the walls and close to the sea. In 1671, it underwent reconstruction, which probably involved the execution of a new altarpiece. In 1673, a painting of the Baby Jesus was done by Josefa de Óbidos for the Capela das Almas (Chapel of the Souls). The restored church was formally inaugurated in 1681. In 1720 the tiles of the sacristy and the nave were painted with scenes from the life of Mary, mother of Jesus and in 1723 a new ceiling was added.

The church suffered significant damage as a result of the 1755 Lisbon earthquake, particularly in the area of the façade and the upper choir, preventing its normal operation. Restoration included the integration of the 17th-century towers into the façade. Following the dissolution of the monasteries in Portugal in 1834, further paintings by Josefa de Óbidos were moved from the nearby convent of Nossa Senhora da Piedade to the nave of the church. In 1898 the businessman, Jorge O'Neil donated an organ to the church and in 1900 the ceiling panel was painted by José Malhoa with the Assumption of Our Lady, following a commission from Queen D. Amélia who, like other members of the royal family, stayed in Cascais for part of the summer every year.

== Gallery ==
Nave looking toward the high altar

High altar and flanking gilded altarpieces

Pulpit between two side altars

Side altar flanked by blue-and-white azulejo panels

Chapel of the Blessed Sacrament with Pedro Alexandrino de Carvalho’s Last Supper

Narrative azulejo panel on the nave wall
