= 2009–10 Santosh Trophy =

Kolkata Football tournament season

2010 Santosh Trophy
64th Senior National Football Championship

Tournament details
- Country: India
- Teams: 31

Final positions
- Champions: West Bengal (30th title)
- Runners-up: Punjab

Tournament statistics
- Matches played: 58
- Goals scored: 244 (4.21 per match)
- Top goal scorer(s): Akum Ao (Assam): 9 goals Balwant Singh (Punjab); 8 goals

The 2010 Santosh Trophy was the 64th edition of the tournament. All matches of the tournament from the quarter-finals stage were played at the Yuva Bharati Krirangan (Salt Lake Stadium) in Kolkata. The tournament began on 16 July 2010 and ended on 8 August 2010 when the final match was played between Bengal and Punjab.

Bengal defeated Punjab 2–1 to lift the trophy for a record 30th time.

== Participating teams ==
31 States / UT teams of India along with Services and Railways will participate in the tournament.

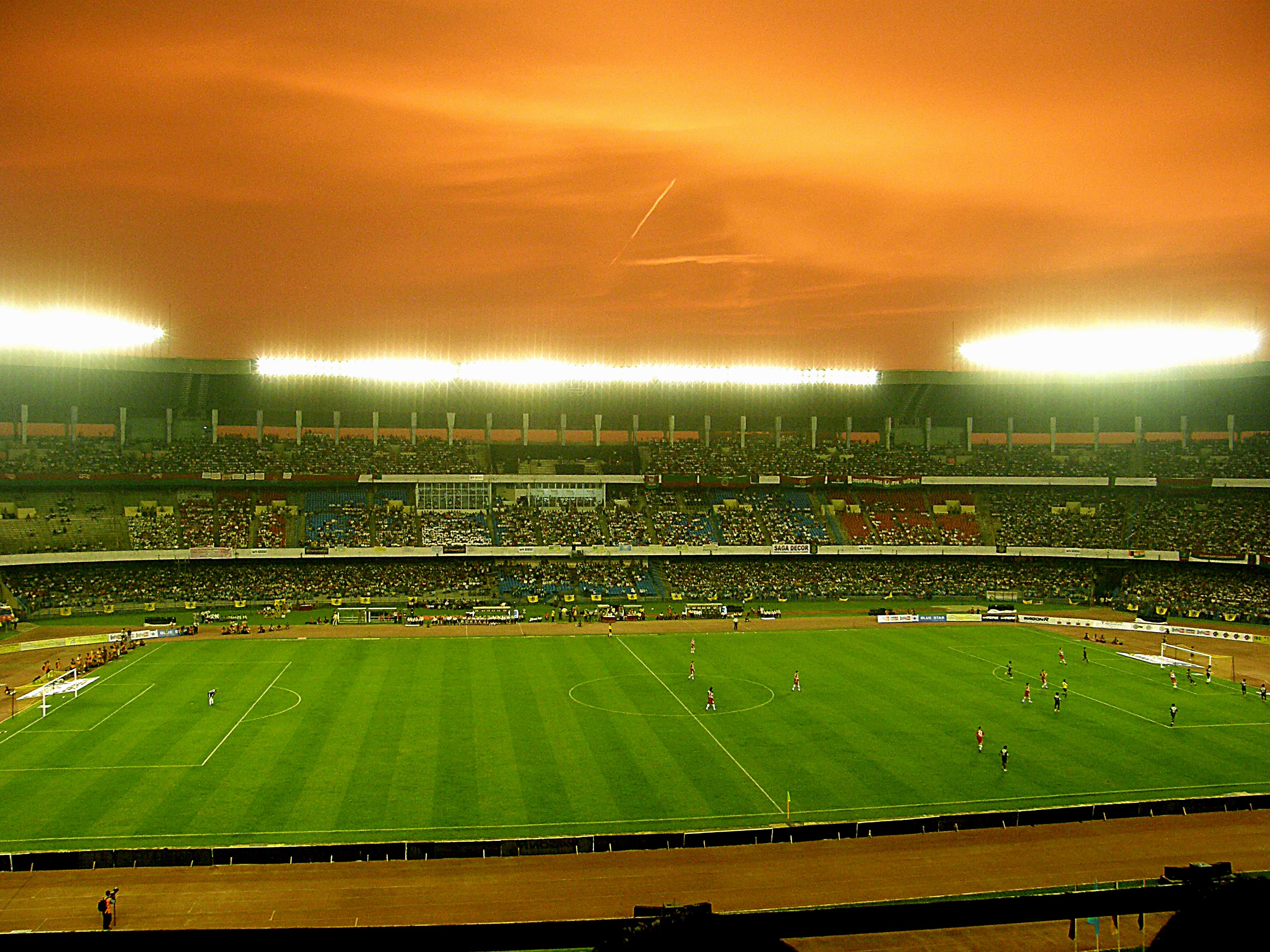
Salt Lake Stadium, which hosts the semi-finals and Final

The defending champions Goa, runners-up West Bengal along with last year's losing semi-finalists Tamil Nadu and Services receive automatic qualification into the quarter-final stage.

Teams directly Qualified for Quarter Finals
Goa
West Bengal
Tamil Nadu
Services

Cluster I	Cluster II	Cluster III	Cluster IV	Cluster V	Cluster VI	Cluster VII	Cluster VIII
Karnataka	Maharashtra	Punjab	Manipur	Delhi	Chhattisgarh	Kerala	Mizoram
Meghalaya	Chandigarh	Pondicherry	Jammu & Kashmir	Madhya Pradesh	Haryana	Assam	Railways
Jharkhand	Tripura	Gujarat	Rajasthan	Uttar Pradesh	Sikkim	Uttarakhand	Orissa
	Andhra Pradesh	Nagaland		Arunachal Pradesh		Himachal Pradesh	Bihar

Legend
Team that qualified for the pre-quarters
Teams that are eliminated

== Qualifying round ==
=== Cluster I ===
Team	Pld	W	D	L	GF	GA	GD	Pts
Karnataka	2	2	0	0	7	1	+6	6
Meghalaya	2	1	0	1	5	1	+4	3
Jharkhand	2	0	0	2	1	11	−10	0

15 July 2010

Karnataka	1 – 0	Meghalaya
Don Bosco 89'	Report

17 July 2010

Meghalaya	5 – 0	Jharkhand
Niwano Gatpoh 31', 37', 62'; Steven Field 85'; Malsawma Gawngliana 90+2'	Report

19 July 2010

Jharkhand	1 – 6	Karnataka
Ravindra Singh 34'	Report	Xavier Vijay Kumar 31'; R.C.Prakash 45+1'; J.Murali 46'; J.Satish Kumar 72'; Ngurneilal 73', 88'

=== Cluster II ===
Team	Pld	W	D	L	GF	GA	GD	Pts
Maharashtra	3	3	0	0	12	2	+10	9
Andhra Pradesh	3	2	0	1	5	6	−1	6
Tripura	3	0	1	2	3	7	−4	1
Chandigarh	3	0	1	2	2	7	−5	1

15 July 2010

Maharashtra	4 – 0	Chandigarh
Reuben D'Souza 35'; Surojit Bose 80', 89'; Alex Ambrose 87'	Report

15 July 2010

Tripura	1 – 2	Andhra Pradesh
Liton Maujumdar 73'	Report	Faijal 6'; W.Vijay Kumar 10'

17 July 2010

Chandigarh	1 – 1	Tripura
Harvinder Singh 90+2'	Report	Rajendra Deb Verma 58'

17 July 2010

Andhra Pradesh	1 – 4	Maharashtra
Duty Kumar Mahto 45'	Report	Alex Ambrose 18', 21'; Reuben D' Souza 26'; Jatin Singh Bisht 64'

19 July 2010

Chandigarh	1 – 2	Andhra Pradesh
Harkeert Singh 71'	Report	Duty Kumar Mahto 21'; W.Vijay Kumar 58'

Khardah

19 July 2010

Maharashtra	4 – 1	Tripura
Darren Caldeira 11'; Surojit Bose 19'; Anees Koralyadan 48', 62'	Report	Kiran Chetri 78'

Barasat

=== Cluster III ===
Team	Pld	W	D	L	GF	GA	GD	Pts
Punjab	3	3	0	0	18	1	+17	9
Nagaland	3	2	0	1	10	1	+9	6
Pondicherry	3	1	0	2	2	14	−12	3
Gujarat	3	0	0	3	2	16	−14	0

16 July 2010

Punjab	7 – 0	Pondicherry
Balwant Singh 29', 49'; Ravinder Singh 31'; Balraj Singh 66'; Rohit Kumar 70'; Parveen Kumar 71'; Randeep Singh 88'	Report

16 July 2010

Gujarat	0 – 4	Nagaland
	Report	Sakutemje 54', 90+3'; Deilierio 77'; Tiafumet 90'

18 July 2010

Pondicherry	2 – 1	Gujarat
Vinod Kumar 18'; Manikandon 73'	Report	Dipesh Pun 40'

18 July 2010

Punjab	1 – 0	Nagaland
Balwant Singh 9'	Report

20 July 2010

Pondicherry	0 – 6	Nagaland
	Report	Nandiabonang 17'; Dilierio 38'; Yapang 51'; Sakutenjen 60', 76', 83'

Howrah

20 July 2010

Punjab	10 – 1	Gujarat
Parveen Kumar 23', 40'; Amandeep Batra 29', 30', 66'; Rahul Batra 34'; Ravindrer Singh 38'; Gurwinder Singh 47'; Balwant Singh 74', 79'	Report	Sutaj Thapa 41'

MMB

=== Cluster IV ===
Team	Pld	W	D	L	GF	GA	GD	Pts
Manipur	2	2	0	0	15	0	+15	6
Rajasthan	2	1	0	1	1	13	−12	3
J&K	2	0	0	2	0	3	−3	0

16 July 2010

Manipur	13 – 0	Rajasthan
Charan Rai 8', 28'; Subhas Singh 12', 38', 58', 67'; R.Vashum 15', 18', 25', 44', 64'; Bisheshwor Singh 22'; Naila Kumar Singh 86'	Report

18 July 2010

Rajasthan	1 – 0	J&K
Rahul Gurjar 83'	Report

20 July 2010

J&K	0 – 2	Manipur
	Report	Jotin Singh 78'; Ksh Lalemlemnganga Singh 82'

Khardah

=== Cluster V ===
Team	Pld	W	D	L	GF	GA	GD	Pts
Delhi	3	3	0	0	8	2	+6	9
Uttar Pradesh	3	2	0	1	10	4	+6	6
Madhya Pradesh	3	1	0	2	4	7	−3	3
Arunachal Pradesh	3	0	0	3	4	13	−9	0

21 July 2010

Delhi	3 – 1	Arunachal Pradesh
Bhuvan Joshi 19'; Vikash Rawat 53'; Tuishim Mashnga 81'	Report	Bamin Tatunga 71'

YBK

21 July 2010

Madhya Pradesh	0 – 3	Uttar Pradesh
	Report	Irfan Zaman Khan 20'; Tushar Chaudhary 72', 86'

Khardah

23 July 2010

Madhya Pradesh	3 – 1	Arunachal Pradesh
Neelesh Pilai 61'; Javed Manihar 82', 90'	Report	Rallo Raj Kumar 85'

Howrah

23 July 2010

Delhi	2 – 0	Uttar Pradesh
Tuishim Mashangva 60'; Bhuvan Joshi 78' (pen.)	Report

Khardah

25 July 2010

Arunachal Pradesh	2 – 7	Uttar Pradesh
Nyamar Loyi 79'; Tagatath 90+2'	Report	Budhiram Soren 8', 23', 45+4'; Tushar Chaudhary 15', 81'; Gyanendra Kashap 45'; Jitendra Kumar 67'

MMB

25 July 2010

Delhi	3 – 1	Madhya Pradesh
David Ngaispe 4'; Bhuvan Joshi 55'; Vikash Rawat 90'	Report	Javed Manihar 17'

Howrah

=== Cluster VI ===
Team	Pld	W	D	L	GF	GA	GD	Pts
Chhattisgarh	2	2	0	0	6	1	+5	6
Sikkim	2	1	0	1	4	1	+3	3
Haryana	2	0	0	2	1	9	−8	0

21 July 2010

Haryana	0 – 4	Sikkim
	Report	Tshering Lepcha 6'; Vikas Jairu 19'; Birendra Rai 22'; Rupesh Diyali 85'

Howrah

23 July 2010

Sikkim	0 – 1	Chhattisgarh
	Report	Wasim Raza 31'

MMB

25 July 2010

Chhattisgarh	5 – 1	Haryana
Wasim Raza 3'; Kulwant Singh 61'; Yugal Kishore Purti 63'; Daniela Paupu 67', 82'	Report	Raghav Khurana 75'

Khardah

=== Cluster VII ===
Team	Pld	W	D	L	GF	GA	GD	Pts
Kerala	3	3	0	0	18	3	+15	9
Assam	3	2	0	1	19	5	+14	6
Uttarakhand	3	1	0	2	5	10	−5	3
Himachal Pradesh	3	0	0	3	0	24	−24	0

22 July 2010

Kerala	3 – 1	Uttarakhand
Sumesh N 31'; Sakeer MP 65'; Javed OK 90+1'	Report	Veer Singh Negi 69'

YBK

22 July 2010

Assam	10 – 0	Himachal Pradesh
S.Warry 11'; Akum Ao 15', 47', 52', 61', 76', 78'; Bulu Zigdung 33', 39'; Chirod Das 87'	Report

MMB

24 July 2010

Uttarakhand	0 – 7	Assam
	Report	Sisuram Chutia 8'; Akum Ao 31', 46'; Ajit Singh 41'; S. Warry 50'; Jelendra Brahma 80', 84'

Khardah

24 July 2010

Kerala	10 – 0	Himachal Pradesh
Javed OK 14', 45+1', 54'; Rakesh K 15', 32'; Sakeer MP 28', 70'; Martin John 43'; Bijesh Ben 55'; Subair KP 83'	Report

MMB

26 July 2010

Uttarakhand	4 – 0	Himachal Pradesh
Veer Singh Negi 16'; Manish Khatri 41'; Lakhwinder Singh 57'; Nikunj Aswal 66'	Report

YBK

26 July 2010

Kerala	5 – 2	Assam
Javed OK 19'; Justin Stephen 42'; Sakeer MP 69'; Bijesh Ben 81'; Subair KP 90+3'	Report	Akum Ao 22'; Jelendra Brahma 86'

YBK

=== Cluster VIII ===
Team	Pld	W	D	L	GF	GA	GD	Pts
Mizoram	3	2	0	1	12	3	+9	6
Railways	3	2	0	1	11	2	+9	6
Orissa	3	2	0	1	6	5	+1	6
Bihar	3	0	0	3	1	20	−19	0

22 July 2010

Mizoram	1 – 3	Orissa
Zaidumawaia Hmar 82'	Report	Sheikh Mustaqim 10', 55'; Maheswar Das 70'

Khardah

22 July 2010

Bihar	1 – 7	Railways
Jiten Lomar 90+2'	Report	Anthony Soren 10', 16', 78'; Suresh Kumar 36'; S.Freddy 39', 60'; Mohammad Moazzam 73'

Howrah

24 July 2010

Orissa	0 – 4	Railways
	Report	Bijoy Das 20'; S.Freedy 27'; D.Nanda Kumar 26'; Suraj Mondal 61'

Howrah

24 July 2010

Mizoram	10 – 0	Bihar
Zaidinmawia Hmar 31'; Beikhokhei 38', 76', 85'; F.Lalrinpuia 46', 53', 64'; Jerry Zirsanga 47', 66'; R. Vanlalnundan 62'	Report

Barasat

26 July 2010

Railways	0 – 1	Mizoram
	Report	Lalrinfela 33'

Howrah

26 July 2010

Orissa	3 – 0	Bihar
Mohammad Ehsan Khan 63'; Sheikh Mustaqim 77', 89'	Report

Khardah

== Pre Quarter Final ==
=== Pre Quarter Final Match 1 ===
21 July 2010
18:00

Karnataka	1 – 0 (a.e.t.)	Maharashtra
Ngurneilal Hamer 92'	Report

Salt Lake Stadium, Kolkata

=== Pre Quarter Final Match 2 ===
22 July 2010
18:00

Punjab	2 – 2 (a.e.t.)	Manipur
Gurpreet Singh 14'; Amandeep Singh 110'	Report	W. Ngouba Singh 87'; R.Vashum 102'
Penalties
Ravinder Singh (penalty scored); Harpreet Singh (penalty scored); Randeep Singh (penalty scored); Balwant Singh (penalty missed); Parveen Singh (penalty scored)	4 – 2	(penalty scored) Samananda Singh; (penalty scored) Syed Farid; (penalty missed) Naoba Singh; (penalty missed) Subhas Singh

Salt Lake Stadium, Kolkata

=== Pre Quarter Final Match 3 ===
27 July 2010
18:00

Delhi	2 – 2 (a.e.t.)	Chhattisgarh
Tuishim Mashangva 39', 48'	Report	Mohammad M. Siddique 66'; Ram Ishimar Mahto 79'
Penalties
Monu Chaudhary (penalty scored); Vikash Rawat (penalty scored); Bhuvan Joshi (penalty scored); Ashish Pandey (penalty missed); Tuishim Mashangva (penalty scored)	4 – 3	(penalty scored) Harshvardhan Shende; (penalty scored) Mohammad M. Siddique; (penalty scored) Partha Dey; (penalty missed) Wasim Raza; (penalty missed) Sudhir Manjhi

Howrah

=== Pre Quarter Final Match 4 ===
28 July 2010
18:00

Kerala	0 – 1	Mizoram
	Report	Beikhokhei 63'

Salt Lake Stadium, Kolkata

== Quarter-final ==
Group A	Group B
Goa (Winners in 2009)	West Bengal (runners-up in 2009)
Services (semi-finalist in 2009)	Tamil Nadu (semi-finalist in 2009)
Karnataka (Winner of Pre Quarter Final Match 1)	Delhi (Winner of Pre Quarter Final Match 3)
Punjab (Winner of Pre Quarter Final Match 2)	Mizoram (Winner of Pre Quarter Final Match 4)

=== Group A ===
Team	Pld	W	D	L	GF	GA	GD	Pts
Goa	3	3	0	0	8	0	+8	9
Punjab	3	2	0	1	6	4	+2	6
Services	3	1	0	2	2	6	−4	3
Karnataka	3	0	0	3	2	8	−6	0

29 July 2010
15:30

Services	0 – 1	Punjab
	Report	Rohit Kumar 74'

Salt Lake Stadium, Kolkata
Referee: Santosh Kumar (Kerala)

29 July 2010
18:00

Goa	1 – 0	Karnataka
Cavin Lobo 90+2'	Report

Salt Lake Stadium, Kolkata
Referee: Magho Singh (Manipur)

31 July 2010
15:30

Karnataka	1 – 2	Services
J.Karthigeyan 70'	Report	Dileep M 55'; Shaji D'Silva 76'

Salt Lake Stadium, Kolkata
Referee: Srikrishna (Tamil Nadu)

31 July 2010
18:00

Punjab	0 – 3	Goa
	Report	Cavin Lobo 57', 90'; Branco Cardozo 90+4'

Salt Lake Stadium, Kolkata
Referee: Minangshu Bhattacharya (IFA)

3 August 2010
15:30

Karnataka	1 – 5	Punjab
R.C.Prakash 40'	Report	Gurpreet Singh 5', 6'; Praveen Kumar 66', 94'; Rohit Kumar 87'

Salt Lake Stadium, Kolkata
Referee: Deepak Dey (Assam)

3 August 2010
18:00

Goa	4 – 0	Services
Milagres Gonsalves 7', 14'; Adil Khan 55'; Clifton Gonsalves 71'	Report

Salt Lake Stadium, Kolkata
Referee: Biplab Poddar (IFA)

=== Group B ===
Team	Pld	W	D	L	GF	GA	GD	Pts
Tamil Nadu	3	2	1	0	5	2	+3	7
West Bengal	3	1	1	1	9	4	+5	4
Delhi	3	0	3	0	2	2	0	3
Mizoram	3	0	1	2	1	9	−8	1

30 July 2010
15:30

Tamil Nadu	2 – 0	Mizoram
C.S.Sabeeth 61'; R.Rajesh 73'	Report

Salt Lake Stadium, Kolkata
Referee: Amjad Khan (WIFA)

30 July 2010
18:00

West Bengal	1 – 1	Delhi
Jayanta Sen 87'	Report	Tuishim Mashangva 40'

Salt Lake Stadium, Kolkata
Referee: Andrew Shekhar (Karnataka)

2 August 2010
15:30

Delhi	1 – 1	Tamil Nadu
David Ngaithe 80'	Report	M.Ramesh 88'

Salt Lake Stadium, Kolkata
Referee: Vishnu Chauhan (Gujarat)

2 August 2010
18:00

Mizoram	1 – 7	West Bengal
F.Lalmuanpuia 67'	Report	Shankar Oraon 10', 55'; Gouranga Dutta 30', 41'; Tarif Ahmed 44'; Jayanta Sen 83'; Nilendra Dewan 90'

Salt Lake Stadium, Kolkata
Referee: Srikrishna (Tamil Nadu)

4 August 2010
15:30

Delhi	0 – 0	Mizoram
	Report

Salt Lake Stadium, Kolkata
Referee: Adley D’Costa (Goa)

4 August 2010
18:00

West Bengal	1 – 2	Tamil Nadu
Nilendra Dewan 15'	Report	V.R.Murugappan 17'; P.C.Riju 78'

Salt Lake Stadium, Kolkata
Referee: Pratap Singh (Uttarakhand)

== Semi-finals ==
6 August 2010
16:00

Goa	1–1	West Bengal
Gonsalves 20'	Report	R. Singh 84'
Penalties
Franco (penalty scored); Lobo (penalty scored); Khan (penalty scored); Dias (penalty missed); Rodrigues (penalty missed)	3–4	(penalty missed) Ghosh; (penalty scored) Sn. Chakraborty; (penalty scored) So. Chakrabarti; (penalty scored) Azim; (penalty scored) Devadas

Salt Lake Stadium, Kolkata
Referee: Magho Singh (Manipur)

6 August 2010
19:00

Tamil Nadu	1–3	Punjab
Elamurgan 90+3'	Report	Balw. Singh 15', 56'; Mani. Singh 35'

Salt Lake Stadium, Kolkata
Referee: Amjad Khan (Maharashtra)

== Final ==
Denson Devadas' brace was enough for West Bengal to claim their record 30th Santosh Trophy title, edging past Punjab 2–1 in the grand finale played at the Salt Lake Stadium at Kolkata. The hosts came back strongly after trailing by a goal to outclass the Jaagir Singh-coached side. Chirag United midfielder scored a goal in each half to seal the match. Bengal looked the better side right from the word go and took an attacking approach, but were missing their two key strikers and it was clearly making things difficult for Coach Shabbir Ali. Tarif Ahmed struggled and was substituted at the half-hour mark. Bengal could have scored in the 19th minute, but to their despair, a Gouranga Dutta right footer hit the woodwork. It was Punjab who, in spite of a cautious start, took the lead in the 31st minute through Balwant Singh, before his right footer was saved by Abhra Mondal two minutes back. Bengal was not to throw in the towel and pulled one back at the stroke of half-time, with Denson heading in a Snehasish Chakraborty corner kick in the near post. The half-time score was 1–1 with both teams leaving the match wide open. Bengal continued their good run and their hard work was finally paid, when Denson once again scored, with his 25-yard scorcher, leaving the Punjab goalkeeper Paramjit Singh stranded before hitting the woodwork and rolling inside in the 76th minute. Punjab tried hard in search of the equaliser, but Bengal successfully held their one-goal advantage to mark their 30th Santosh Trophy title.

8 August 2010
17:00

West Bengal	2–1	Punjab
Devadas 45+2', 76'	Report	Balw. Singh 31'

Salt Lake Stadium, Kolkata
Referee: Pratap Singh (Uttarakhand)

West Bengal
Punjab

WEST BENGAL
GK	24	Abhra Mondal
DF	6	Sheikh Azim
DF	24	Arnab Mondal
MF	5	R Dhanarajan
MF	7	Jayanta Sen
MF	13	Denson Devadas	(yellow card) 90+3'
MF	15	Snehasish Chakraborty (c)
MF	23	Rajiv Ghosh	(yellow card) 90+2'
FW	10	Tarif Ahmed	(substituted off) 35'
FW	27	Robin Singh
FW	30	Gouranga Dutta	(substituted off) 90+4'
Substitutions:
GK	1	Somnath Khara
DF	3	Habibur Rehman Mondal
FW	9	Nilendra Dewan
MF	12	Anupam Sarkar
FW	14	Souvik Chakraborty	(substituted on) 35'
GK	21	Sandip Nandy
DF	22	Safar Sardar	(substituted on) 90+4'
Coach:
Shabbir Ali

PUNJAB
GK	1	Paramjit Singh
DF	3	Ravinder Singh
DF	4	Mandeep Singh
DF	5	Harpreet Singh (c)
DF	6	Maninder Singh
MF	8	Rahul Kumar
MF	16	Gurwinder Singh	(yellow card) 23'	(substituted off) 46'
MF	17	Amandeep Singh
MF	19	Randeep Singh
FW	9	Balwant Singh	(substituted off) 80'
FW	12	Balraj Singh	(substituted off) 81'
Substitutions:
DF	2	Amandeep
MF	7	Harshdeep Singh
FW	10	Rohit Kumar	(substituted on) 81'
MF	11	Amandeep Batra
FW	14	Parveen Kumar	(substituted on) 46'
DF	15	Warundeep Singh	(substituted on) 80'
DF	21	Bhupinder Singh
GK	22	Deepak Hazarika
Coach:
Jaagir Singh

MATCH OFFICIALS

- Referee: Pratap Singh (Uttarakhand)
- Assistant referees:
  - Amjad Khan (WIFA)
  - Srikrishna (Tamil Nadu)
- Fourth official: Magho Singh (Manipur)
- Referee Assessor: A.U.K Nair (Gujarat)
- Match Commissioner: S.S.Shetty (WIFA)
