= Castle of Folgosinho =

Medieval castle in Guarda, Portugal

- Castelo de Folgosinho
- Guarda, Serra da Estrela, Centro in Portugal
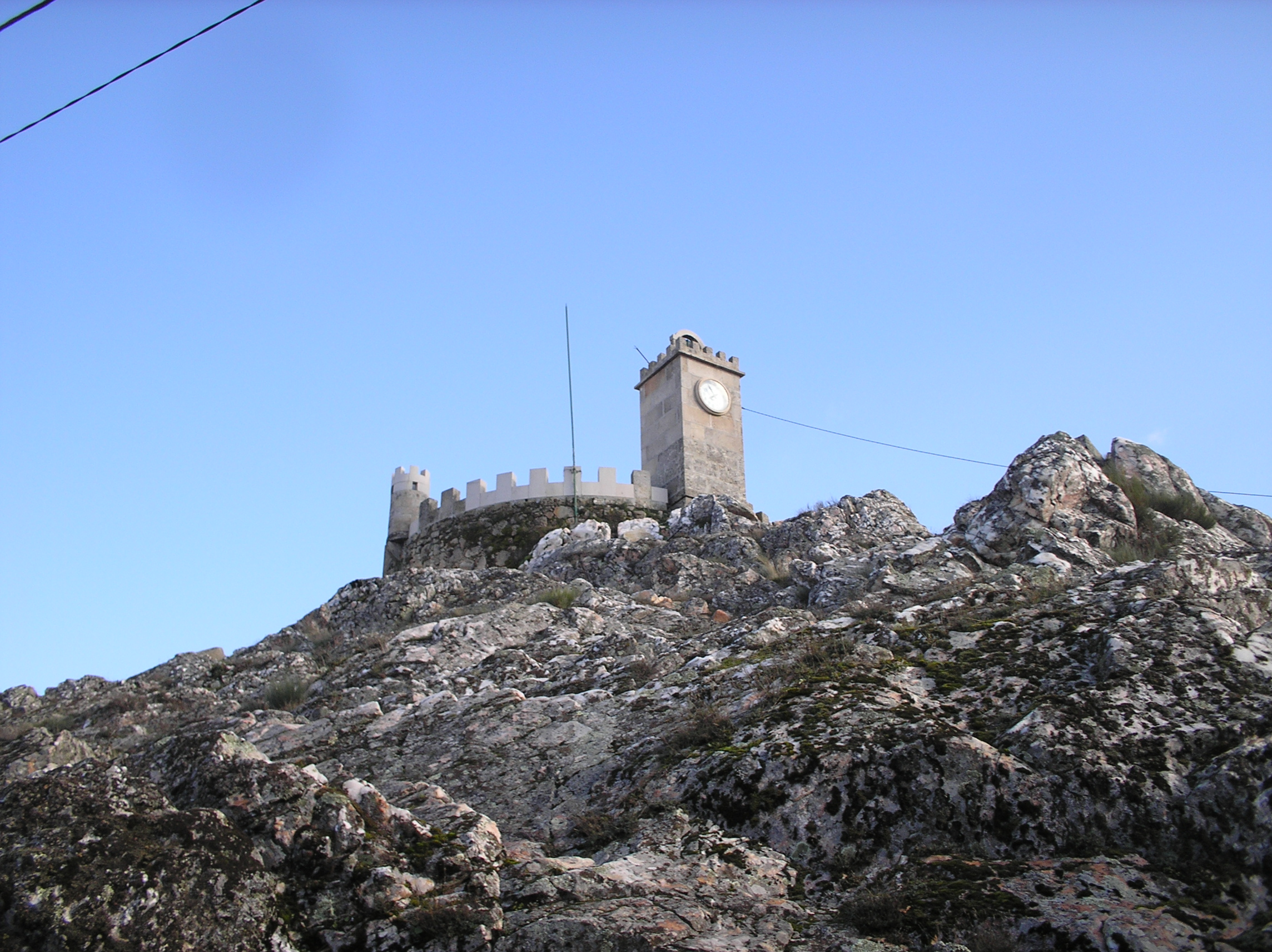
- A view of the castle from the base of the Serra dos Galhardos

Site information
- Type: Castle
- Owner: Portuguese Republic
- Open to the public: Public

Location
- Coordinates: 40°30′39.7″N 7°30′43.8″W

Site history
- Built: 12th century
- Materials: Granite, Masonry

The Castle of Folgosinho (Portuguese: Castelo de Folgosinho), is a medieval castle in the civil parish of Folgosinho, municipality of the Gouveia in the district of Guarda in the Centre region of Portugal.

== History ==
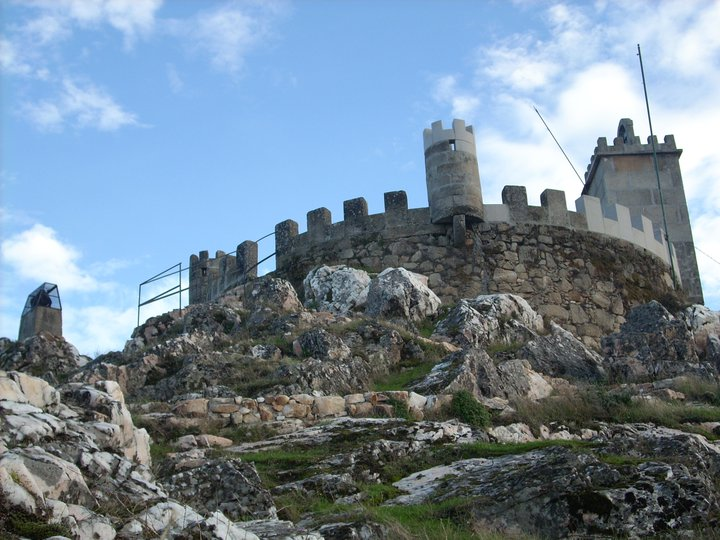
A view of the circular plan of the walled citadel

The castle was constructed in 1183, likely built over the ruins of a former-Lusitanian castro, by men under the orders of King D. Sancho I. Vestiges of the ancient castro were subsumed in the beginning of the 20th century. In 1187, King Sancho would issue a Foral (charter) for Folgosinho, that would be reconfirmed during the reign of King D. Afonso II (in 1217), then in 1350 by King D. Denis. But, its construction is debated by Portuguese archaeologists. In the beginning of the 20th century, some investigators recognized primitive vestiges of the primitive medieval castle, which they attribute to the actions of D. Sancho I. Unfortunately, it can not be confirmed, especially since multiple archaeological excavations suggest a medieval origin. What is clear, is that Folgosinho did not constitute part of the primary lines of conquest and military delineation of the national territory, but rather as part of a wider settlement strategy. But, even these require further documentation. Over the centuries, military documentation is non-existent, and most references associated with the forals passed by D. Afonso II, D. Dinis and D. Manuel, with little evidence on the preponderance of control or management of the territory.

By the 15th century, the castle was part of the possessions of the Sousa family in the district. At this time, around 1512, a new foral was conceded by King D. Manuel. Owing to the number of forals issued to the town and hinterland, the lands of Folgosinho were considered Terra de El - Rei, and were given to Donatary-Captains, the included the Marqueses of Arronches, the Dukes of Lafões and the Counts of Miranda do Corvo. Furthermore, the lands of Folgosinho were constituent parts of the commandery of the Order of Christ.

Following the administrative reorganization of the kingdom, in 1836, Folgosinho ceased to be the seat of the municipality, and Gouveia became that administrative centre.

At the middle of the 20th century, the castle was classified as a Property of Public Interest, initiating a phase of reexamination, that would ultimately lead to it being a regional tourist attraction. By 1938-1939, the civil parish authority began work on reconstructing the castle. But, when the civil parish of Folgosinho indicated their intention to reconstruct the castle, the monument was already in ruin.

== Architecture ==
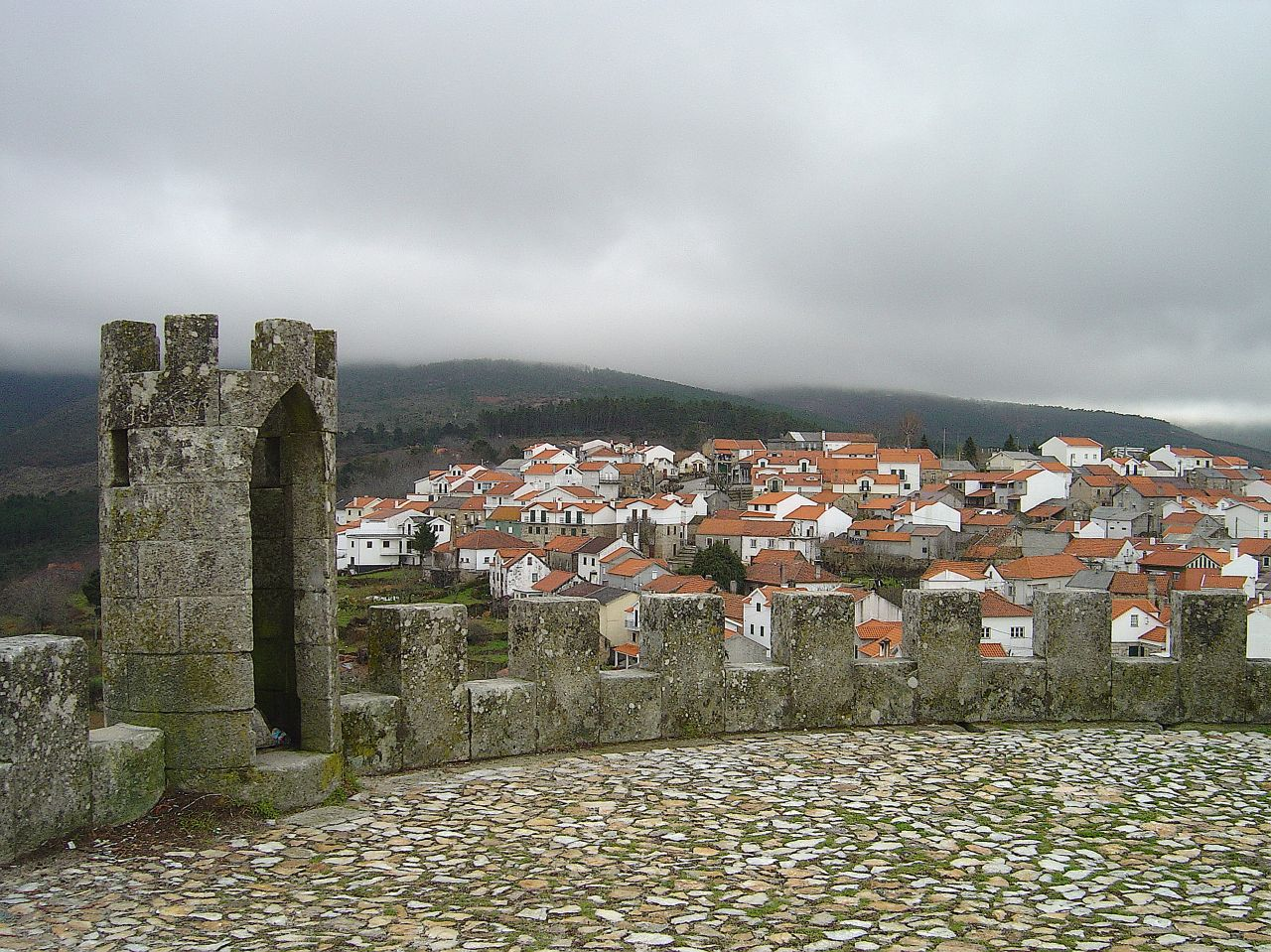
One of the watchtowers on the top of the tower overlooking the town of Folgosinho

The castle is situated in an urban context, along the edges of the agglomerated townscape, on the top of 930 metres (3,050 ft) hill consisting of white and red quartz, on the flanks of the Serra dos Galhardos, overlooking the valley of Mondego.

The castle has a circular 10 metres (33 ft) plan, with a lower masonry wall and superior wall in stonework, with a slightly elevated and deep adarve. The perimeter of the wall is interrupted in the west by an access to the courtyard, a square keep tower in the east (with corbels) and, in the north, a gate with lintel and bell preceded by protruding frieze and surmounted by small rectangular merlons. It also includes three cylindrical guard towers, with door in broken arches and rectangular merlons.

Within the interior of the castle is a geodesic marker.
