= India national football team results (unofficial matches 1948–1999) =

This is a list of the India national football team's results from 1948 to 1999 that, for various reasons, are not accorded the status of official International A Matches.

Key
| Win |
| Draw |
| Defeat |

Note: The following list may not be complete

== 1940s ==
| 3 June 1948 | India | 4–0 | Afghanistan | Bombay, India |
| | Dhanraj; Raman; Mewalal; Parab | Report |

| 13 July 1948 | Department Store XI (England) | 0–15 | India | London, England |

| 16 July 1948 | Metropolitan Police F.C. (England) | 1–3 | India | Thames Ditton, England |

| 17 July 1948 Friendly | China | 0–1 | India XI | Calcutta, India |
| | | RSSSF | Nayar 52' (pen.) |

| 24 July 1948 | Pinner F.C. (England) | 1–9 | India | Pinner, England |

| 26 July 1948 | Hayes F.C. (England) | 1–4 | India | Hayes, Hillingdon, England |
| | | | | Stadium: Church Road (football stadium) |

| 28 July 1948 | Alexandra Park FC (England) | 2–8 | India | Wood Green, England |

| 12 August 1948 | Sparta Rotterdam (Netherlands) | 2–1 | India | Rotterdam, Netherlands |
| | Van Male; Meeken | | Mewalal | Stadium: Het Kasteel |

| 14 August 1948 | AFC Ajax (Netherlands) | 1–5 | India | Amsterdam, Netherlands |
| | | | | Stadium: De Meer Stadion |

| 16 August 1948 | VUC Den Haag (Netherlands) | 1–0 | India | The Hague, Netherlands |

| 21 August 1948 | Isthmian League (England) | 1–3 | India | Ilford, England |
| | Groves | | Dhanraj |

| 23 August 1948 | India | 4–1 | Wales Amateur | Wrexham, Wales |
| | Manna; Mewalal; Raman | | Reynolds | Stadium: Racecourse Ground |

| 26 August 1948 | India | 0–0 | Wales Amateur | Swansea, Wales |
| | | | | Stadium: Vetch Field |

| 31 August 1948 | India | 1–0 | (England) Boldmere FC | Sutton Coldfield, England |
| | | | | Stadium: Church Road Ground |

| 31 August 1948 | India | 1–1 | (England) Athenian League | Finchley, England |
| | | | | Stadium: Old Finchleians Memorial Ground |

| 26 April 1949 | Ceylon | 0–1 | India | Colombo, Ceylon |
| | | Report | Noor 3' (o.g.) | Stadium: Government Services Ground |

| 29 April 1949 | Ceylon | 1–6 | India | Colombo, Ceylon |
| | | Report | Raman; Ahmed Khan; Dhanraj; Prasad | Stadium: Government Services Ground |

== 1950s ==
| 12 March 1952 Friendly | (Dominion of Ceylon) Badulla XI | 0–5 | India | Ceylon |
| | | Report | Veeriah 8' (o.g.); Patrick 20'; G.Y.S. Laiq; Moin |

| 3 November 1953 Friendly | Pakistan | 1–0 | India | Yangon, Burma |
| | Kutty (~85) | Report | | Stadium: Aung San Stadium; Referee: Campbell (IFA) |

| 6 February 1955 Friendly | India | 0–4 | Soviet Union | New Delhi, India |
| | | Report | Kuznetsov 20', 28', 56'; Voynov 25' | Stadium: Jawaharlal Nehru Stadium; Attendance: 35000; Referee: A.N. Jayaraman (India) |

| 27 February 1955 Friendly | India | 0–3 | Soviet Union | Bombay, India |
| | | Report | Simonyan 3', 60'; Tatushin 16' | Stadium: Brabourne Stadium; Attendance: 35000; Referee: N.K. Utchil (India) |

| 6 March 1955 Friendly | India | 0–3 | Soviet Union | Calcutta, India |
| | | Report | Voynov 18'; Tatushin 24', 39' | Stadium: East Bengal Ground; Attendance: 70000; Referee: Aloke Roy (India) |

| 23 August 1955 Friendly | Lokomotiv Moscow (Soviet Union) | 3–0 | India | Moscow, USSR |
| | Viktor Sokolov 23'; Kovalyov 30'; Razumovskiy 47' | Report | | Stadium: Central Dynamo Stadium; Referee: Konstantin Demchenko (USSR) |

| 28 August 1955 Friendly | Georgian SSR (Georgian Soviet Socialist Republic) | 6–0 | India | Tbilisi, Georgian SSR |
| | | Report |

| 2 September 1955 Friendly | Armenian SSR (Armenian Soviet Socialist Republic) | 2–2 | India | Yerevan, Armenian SSR |
| | Selesten Gnuni 2', 48' | Report | Swaraj Ghosh 77'; Anthony 79' | Referee: Nikolay Khlopotin (Moskva) |

| 5 September 1955 Friendly | Odessa XI (Soviet Union) | 0–1 | India | Odessa, USSR |
| | | Report | Ghulam Y.S. Laiq 44' | Stadium: Stadion Pishchevik; Attendance: 30000 |

| 11 September 1955 Friendly | Krylia Sovetov (Soviet Union) | 4–1 | India | Moscow, USSR |
| | Aleksandr Gulevskiy; Novikov | Report | Thapa 29' | Stadium: Central Dynamo Stadium; Attendance: 20000; Referee: Elmar Saar (USSR) |

| 19 September 1955 Friendly | Leningrad XI (Soviet Union) | 8–0 | India | Leningrad, USSR |
| | Lazar Kravets; Aleksandr Denisov; Voynov; Bondarenko | Report |

| 25 December 1955 Friendly | Pakistan | 1–0 | India | Dacca, East Pakistan |
| | Tajul Islam Manna | Report | | Stadium: Dacca Stadium |

| 9 September 1959 Singapore Festival | Singapore A | 1–5 | India | Kallang, Singapore |
| 7:30 pm | Abdul Rahman 75' | Report | Rahmatullah 27'; P. K. Banerjee 45'; Zulfiquer 62', 70'; Lahiri 74' | Stadium: Jalan Besar Stadium |

| 10 September 1959 Singapore Festival | South Vietnam | 5–1 | India | Kallang, Singapore |
| | Ly Van Ron 10'; Hing 27', 60', 77'; Nguyễn Ngọc Thanh 74' | Report | P. K. Banerjee 48' | Stadium: Jalan Besar Stadium; Attendance: 7500; Referee: H. Angullia (Singapore) |

| 11 September 1959 Singapore Festival | Singapore | 2–3 | India | Kallang, Singapore |
| | Kim Swee 45'; Majid Arif 69' | Report | Balaram 55', 88'; Lahiri 89' | Stadium: Jalan Besar Stadium |

== 1960s ==
| 18 August 1961 Singapore Festival | India | 0–0 | South Korea XI | Kallang, Singapore |
| | | Report | | Stadium: Jalan Besar Stadium |

| 1 September 1964 1964 Merdeka | India | 3–2 | Japan XI | Kuala Lumpur, Malaysia |
| | Chuni Goswami; Kajal Mukherjee; Derek D'Souza | | Mutsuhiko Nomura; Takayuki Kuwata |

| 3 September 1964 1964 Merdeka | South Korea | 0−0 (Note: The match abandoned after 59th minute and replayed.) | India | Kuala Lumpur, Malaysia |

| 4 September 1964 1964 Merdeka | South Korea XI | 1–2 | India | Kuala Lumpur, Malaysia |
| | Park Im Sun | Report | Banerjee; Inder Singh | Attendance: 20,000 |

| 8 September 1964 Friendly | India | 6–4 | Taiwan | Kuala Lumpur, Malaysia |
| | Inder Singh 38', 64'; Banerjee 57'; Derek D'Souza 69', 72', 79' | Report | Wong Man-wai 8'; Cheung Chi Doy 9'; Wong Chi-keung 20'; Wan Chi Keung 39' | Stadium: Stadium Merdeka; Attendance: 8,000 |

| 15 August 1965 1965 Merdeka | Japan XI | 1–1 | India | Ipoh, Malaysia |
| | Katsuyoshi Kuwahara | Report | Ashim Moulick | Stadium: Perak Stadium |

| 30 August 1965 Friendly | Singapore Invitational | 2–3 | India | Singapore |
| | Gurunathan 45'; Kbari Yusof 85' | Report | Ashok Chatterjee 16'; S. Anthony 28'; Kajal Mukherjee 28' | Stadium: Jalan Besar Stadium |

| 31 August 1965 Friendly | Singapore | 1–2 | India | Singapore |
| | Lee Wah Chin 45' | Report | Prasanta Sinha 48'; Jarnail Singh 77' | Stadium: Jalan Besar Stadium; Attendance: 5000; Referee: R. C. Brassey |

| 13 August 1966 1966 Merdeka | Japan | 0–3 | India | Kuala Lumpur, Malaysia |
| | | Report | Ashok Chaterjee; I. Arumainayagam | Stadium: Stadium Merdeka |

| 13 August 1967 1967 Merdeka Tour | India | 3–1 | Western Australia | Kuala Lumpur, Malaysia |
| | Inder Singh; Marto Gracias | Report | T. Lawlow | Stadium: Stadium Merdeka |

| 21 August 1968 1968 Merdeka Tour | India | 1–0 | Japan B | Kuala Lumpur, Malaysia |
| | N Pappana | | | Stadium: Stadium Merdeka |

| 29 August 1968 Friendly | Indonesia | 3–1 | India | Kallang, Singapore |
| | Abdul kadir 30'; Jacob Sihasale 54'; Komar Nairuddin 86' | Report | Syed Nayeemuddin 11' | Stadium: Jalan Besar Stadium |

| 30 August 1968 Friendly | South Vietnam | 2–0 | India | Kallang, Singapore |
| | | Report | | Stadium: Jalan Besar Stadium |

| 30 October 1969 1969 Merdeka | India | 0–1 | Western Australia | Kuala Lumpur, Malaysia |
| | | Report | | Stadium: Stadium Merdeka |

== 1970s ==
| 5 August 1970 1970 Merdeka | India | 2–0 | Western Australia | Kuala Lumpur, Malaysia |
| | Magan Singh |

| 10 June 1971 1971 Jakarta Anniversary | India | n/a | South Korea B | Jakarta, Indonesia |
| | | Report | | Stadium: Senayan Stadium |

| 21 August 1971 1971 Merdeka Cup | Japan XI | 1–0 | India | Kuala Lumpur, Malaysia |
| | Noritaka Hidaka | Report |

| 29 July 1973 1973 Merdeka Cup | South Korea | 0–0 | India | Kuala Lumpur, Malaysia |
| | | Report |

| April 1975 Marah Halim Cup | Singapore Reserves | 2–5 | India | Medan, Indonesia |
| | | | | Stadium: Teladan Stadium |

| April 1975 Marah Halim Cup | Taiwan | 0–2 | India | Medan, Indonesia |
| | | | | Stadium: Teladan Stadium |

| April 1975 Marah Halim Cup | Persib Bandung (Indonesia) | 0–1 | India | Medan, Indonesia |
| | | | | Stadium: Teladan Stadium |

| April 1975 Marah Halim Cup | PSMS Medan (Indonesia) | 1–3 | India | Medan, Indonesia |
| | | | | Stadium: Teladan Stadium |

| April 1975 Marah Halim Cup | India | 0–1 | Thailand XI | Medan, Indonesia |
| | | | | Stadium: Teladan Stadium |

| April 1975 Marah Halim Cup | India | 0–3 | South Korea XI | Medan, Indonesia |
| | | | | Stadium: Teladan Stadium |

| 18 July 1976 Afghanistan Republic Day Festival Cup | India | 0–5 | (Soviet Union) CSKA Pamir | Kabul, Afghanistan |
| | | Report | | Stadium: Ghazi Stadium |

| 19 July 1976 Afghanistan Republic Day Festival Cup | India | 2–1 | Afghanistan B | Kabul, Afghanistan |
| | Shabbir Ali; Harjinder Singh | Report | | Stadium: Ghazi Stadium |

| 21 July 1976 (Note: This match against Pakistan in 1976 is considered as full A international by some RSSSF sources.) Afghanistan Republic Day Festival Cup | Pakistan XI | 1–1 | India | Kabul, Afghanistan |
| | Unknown | Report | Harjinder Singh | Stadium: Ghazi Stadium |

| 23 July 1976 Afghanistan Republic Day Festival Cup | India | 3–0 | Iran XI | Kabul, Afghanistan |
| | Bala Subramaniam; Harjinder Singh | Report | | Stadium: Ghazi Stadium |

| 17 September 1976 President Cup | India | 0–2 | (Brazil) São Paulo FC | Seoul, South Korea |
| | | Report |

| 9 September 1977 President Cup | Middlesex Wanderers (England) | 1–0 | India | Seoul, South Korea |
| | Brooks 82' | Report | | Stadium: Dongdaemun Stadium, Seoul |

| 11 September 1977 President Cup | India | 4–2 | (Lebanon) Racing Beirut | Seoul, South Korea |
| | Devraj Doraiswamy 15'; Pushparaj Kumar 50'; Ulaganathan 53'; H. Singh 80' | Report | Michael Raffoul 33'; Charles Antonio 81' |

| 21 October 1979 Friendly | United Arab Emirates | 0–0 | India | United Arab Emirates |
| | | Report |

| October 1979 Friendly | Bahrain | 0–2 | India | Bahrain |
| | | Report | Shabbir Ali |

== 1980s ==
| 18 September 1981 1981 Merdeka Cup | India | 0–2 | (Brazil) Sao Paulo FC | Kuala Lumpur, Malaysia |
| | | AIFF | | Stadium: Stadium Merdeka |

| 25 February 1982 1982 Nehru Cup | India | 0–1 | Italy Olympic | Calcutta, India |
| | | Report |

| 27 February 1982 1982 Nehru Cup | India | 2–1 | Yugoslavia B | Eden Gardens, Kolkata |
| | Monoranjan Bhattacharya; Manas Bhattacharya | Report |

| 11 June 1982 1982 President's Cup | PSV Eindhoven (Netherlands) | 1–1 | India | Gwangju Mudeung Stadium, Gwangju |
| 15:00 KST | Poortvliet 70' | Report | C. B. Thapa 49' |

| 15 March 1983 1983 Nehru Cup | India | 1–2 | China U19 | Kochi, India |
| | Akkum | Report |

| 17 March 1983 1983 Nehru Cup | India | 0–1 | Italy U18 | Kochi, India |
| | | Report |

| 20 March 1983 1983 Nehru Cup | India | 1–2 | Hungary Olympic Team | Kochi, India |
| | Parminder Singh | Report |

| 19 January 1984 1984 Nehru Cup | Vasas Budapest (Hungary) | 1−0 | India | Calcutta, India |
| | Gabor Hires 43' | RSSSF | | Stadium: Eden Gardens |

| 22 January 1984 1984 Nehru Cup | Romania U-21 | 0−0 | India | Calcutta, India |
| | | RSSSF | | Stadium: Eden Gardens |

| 23 January 1985 1985 Nehru Cup | India | 0−1 | South Korea Youth | Cochin, India |
| | | | Kim Sam-Soo 78' | Stadium: Jawaharlal Nehru Stadium; Referee: Bahman Bouhlooli Ghezelche (Iran) |

| 27 January 1985 1985 Nehru Cup | India | 2−3 | Algeria B | Cochin, India |
| | Aloke Mukherjee 65'; Bikash Panji 70' | | Mohamed Mehaid 65'; Lahouari Belkhetouat 86'; Naceur Badache 88' | Stadium: Jawaharlal Nehru Stadium; Referee: Bahman Bouhlooli Ghezelche (Iran) |

| 23 December 1985 1985 S.A.Games | India | 3−0 | Bhutan | Dhaka, Bangladesh |
| | Mani; Ghosh | Report |

| 17 January 1986 1986 Nehru Cup | India | 0−6 | Soviet Union B | Trivandrum, India |
| | | | Vadym Yevtushenko 18', 42'; Igor Belanov 25'; Andriy Bal 81', 85'; Vasyl Rats 87' | Stadium: Greenfield International Stadium |

| 20 January 1986 1986 Nehru Cup | India | 0−1 | South Korea Youth | Trivandrum, India |
| | | | Choi Jae-Hyuk 76', 81' (pen.) | Stadium: Greenfield International Stadium |

| 22 January 1986 1986 Nehru Cup | India | 0−5 | East Germany | Trivandrum, India |
| | | | Frank Pastor; Jürgen Raab; Thomas Doll | Stadium: Greenfield International Stadium |

| 22 July 1986 1986 Merdeka | India | 1−1 | Indonesia XI | Kuala Lumpur, Malaysia |
| | Krishanu Dey 54' | | Adityo Darmadi 28' | Stadium: Stadium Merdeka; Attendance: 17,294 |

| 26 July 1986 (Note: The precise designation of the South Korean team is not clear. But the match against South Korea XI is considered as an international A match for India by some sources of RSSSF.) 1986 Merdeka | India | 4−3 | South Korea XI | Kuala Lumpur, Malaysia |
| | Krishanu Dey 3', 17'; V. P. Sathyan; Mauricio Afonso | Report | Cha Kee-Chul 11', 60'; Kim Dae-Heun | Stadium: Stadium Merdeka; Attendance: 2551 |

| 1 August 1986 1986 Merdeka | Sigma Olomouc (Czechoslovakia) | 1−0 | India | Kuala Lumpur, Malaysia |
| | Ladislav Kucernak 115' | | | Stadium: Stadium Merdeka; Attendance: 21493; Referee: Kim Kee-Chul (Korea Football Association) |

| 22 January 1987 1987 Nehru Cup | India | 1−1 | China B | Kozhikode, India |
| | Pem Dorji 65' | | Yang Weijian 40' | Stadium: EMS Stadium; Attendance: 80,000 |

| 28 January 1987 1987 Nehru Cup | India | 0−2 | Bulgaria Olympic Team | Kozhikode, India |
| | | | Lyuboslav Penev 70'; Vasil Simov 80' | Stadium: EMS Stadium; Attendance: 75,000 |

| 1 February 1987 1987 Nehru Cup | India | 1−1 | Denmark League Team | Kozhikode, India |
| | Sisir Ghosh | | Jesper Bo Pedersen | Stadium: EMS Stadium; Attendance: 1,00,000 |

| 19 January 1988 1988 Nehru Cup | India | 0–2 | China B | Siliguri, India |
| | | | Su Hui 31'; Gao Hongbo 66' | Stadium: Kanchenjunga Stadium |

| 22 January 1988 1988 Nehru Cup | India | 1–4 | Hungary Olympic | Siliguri, India |
| | Tarun Dey (pen.) | | László Nagy; Gyula Plotár; György Zirchar ? | Stadium: Kanchenjunga Stadium |

| 25 January 1988 1988 Nehru Cup | India | 0–3 | Bulgaria Olympic | Siliguri, India |
| | | | Musheer Ahmed (o.g.); Yordan Mitev; Ivaylo Stoyanov | Stadium: Kanchenjunga Stadium |

| 28 January 1988 1988 Nehru Cup | India | 1–1 | Poland Olympic | Siliguri, India |
| | P Vijay Kumar | | Marek Leśniak 76' | Stadium: Kanchenjunga Stadium |

| 1 February 1988 1988 Nehru Cup | India | 0–2 | Soviet Union Olympic | Siliguri, India |
| | | | Aleksandr Borodyuk | Stadium: Kanchenjunga Stadium |

| 8 January 1989 Friendly | India | 0–4 | (Brazil) São Paulo FC | New Delhi, India |
| | | Report | Anílton; Renatinho; Benê; Flávio |

| 11 January 1989 Friendly | India | 2–2 | (Brazil) São Paulo FC | Bangalore |
| | Kuljit Singh | Report | Mazinho; Flávio |

| 20 January 1989 1989 Nehru Cup | India | 0–2 | Poland U21 | Margao, India |
| | | | Jacek Bayer 48'; Mirosław Kubisztal 86' | Stadium: Fatorda Stadium |

| 24 January 1989 1989 Nehru Cup | India | 0–2 | Soviet Union U21 | Margao, India |
| | | | Andrey Kobelev 81'; Gela Ketashvili 87' (pen.) | Stadium: Fatorda Stadium |

| 27 January 1989 1989 Nehru Cup | India | 1–2 | North Korea | Margao, India |
| | Bikash Panji | | Yong-Nam Oh; Yun-Chol Kim | Stadium: Fatorda Stadium |

| 29 January 1989 1989 Nehru Cup | India | 1–2 | Iraq Youth | Margao, India |
| | Satyajit Chatterjee | | | Stadium: Fatorda Stadium |

| 29 January 1989 1989 Nehru Cup | India | 0–1 | Hungary Olympic | Margao, India |
| | | | Róbert Jován 28' | Stadium: Fatorda Stadium |

| 22 May 1989 1989 President's Gold Cup | Liaoning (China) | 1–0 | India | Dhaka, Bangladesh |
| | Moonwi | Report | | Stadium: Dhaka Stadium |

| 24 May 1989 1989 President's Gold Cup | Bangladesh Green | 1–0 | India | Dhaka, Bangladesh |
| | Iqbalur Rahman Iqbal 76' | Report | | Stadium: Dhaka Stadium |

| 26 May 1989 1989 President's Gold Cup | Korea University (South Korea) | 0–0 | India | Dhaka, Bangladesh |
| | | Report | | Stadium: Dhaka Stadium |

== 1990s ==
| 13 January 1991 1991 Nehru Cup | India | 0–3 | Romania B | Trivandrum, India |
| | | | | Stadium: Greenfield International Stadium |

| 20 January 1991 1991 Nehru Cup | India | 1–0 | Zambia | Trivandrum, India |
| | Bikash Panji | | | Stadium: Greenfield International Stadium |

| 22 January 1991 1991 Nehru Cup | India | 0–1 | China | Trivandrum, India |
| | | | | Stadium: Greenfield International Stadium |

| 24 January 1991 1991 Nehru Cup | India | 1–3 | Soviet Union | Trivandrum, India |
| | | | | Stadium: Greenfield International Stadium |

| 4 August 1991 1992 Olympics Q | Oman | 1–1 | India | Hyderabad, India |
| | | | Mario Soares | Stadium: G. M. C. Balayogi Athletic Stadium |

| 8 August 1991 1992 Olympics Q | India | 1–3 | Lebanon | Hyderabad, India |
| | I. M. Vijayan | | | Stadium: G. M. C. Balayogi Athletic Stadium |

| 11 August 1991 1992 Olympics Q | Syria | 1–0 | India | Hyderabad, India |
| | | | | Stadium: G. M. C. Balayogi Athletic Stadium |

| 11 August 1991 1992 Olympics Q | Kuwait | 2–1 | India | Hyderabad, India |
| | | | Godfrey Pereira | Stadium: G. M. C. Balayogi Athletic Stadium |

| 18 July 1993 1993 SAFF Cup | India | 3–1 | Pakistan B | Lahore, Pakistan |
| | I. M. Vijayan; Kumaresh Bhawal |

| 22 March 1995 1995 Nehru Cup | India | 1–0 | Uzbekistan U-20 | Calcutta, India |
| | | Report |

| 24 March 1995 1995 Nehru Cup | Russia U-20 | 3–0 | India | Calcutta, India |
| | | Report |

| 8 April 1997 1997 Nehru Cup | India | 2–2 | Ghana XI | Kochi, India |
| | Vijayan 10'; Bhutia 53' | Report | Alex Donkor 37'; Oa Princeton 80' | Stadium: Jawaharlal Nehru Stadium; Attendance: 35,000 |

| 4 April 1997 1997 Nehru Cup | India | 2–2 | Uzbekistan B | Kochi, India |
| | Vijayan 41'; Chapman 86' | Report | Soliev Anvarjon 24'; Akopyants 81' | Stadium: Jawaharlal Nehru Stadium; Attendance: 20,000 |

| 3 December 1998 1998 Asian Games Preliminary Round | Japan | 1–0 | India | Trang, Thailand |
| 15:30 ICT | Fukuda 55' | Report | | Stadium: Trang Stadium |

| 28 September 1999 1999 South Asian Games | India | 3–0 | Bhutan | Kathmandu, Nepal |
| | Vijayan 1', 8', 49' | Report RSSSF |

== See also ==
- India national football team results (unofficial matches 1924–1947)
- India national football team results (unofficial matches 2000–present)
