= Clementina Carneiro de Moura =

Portuguese modernist artist

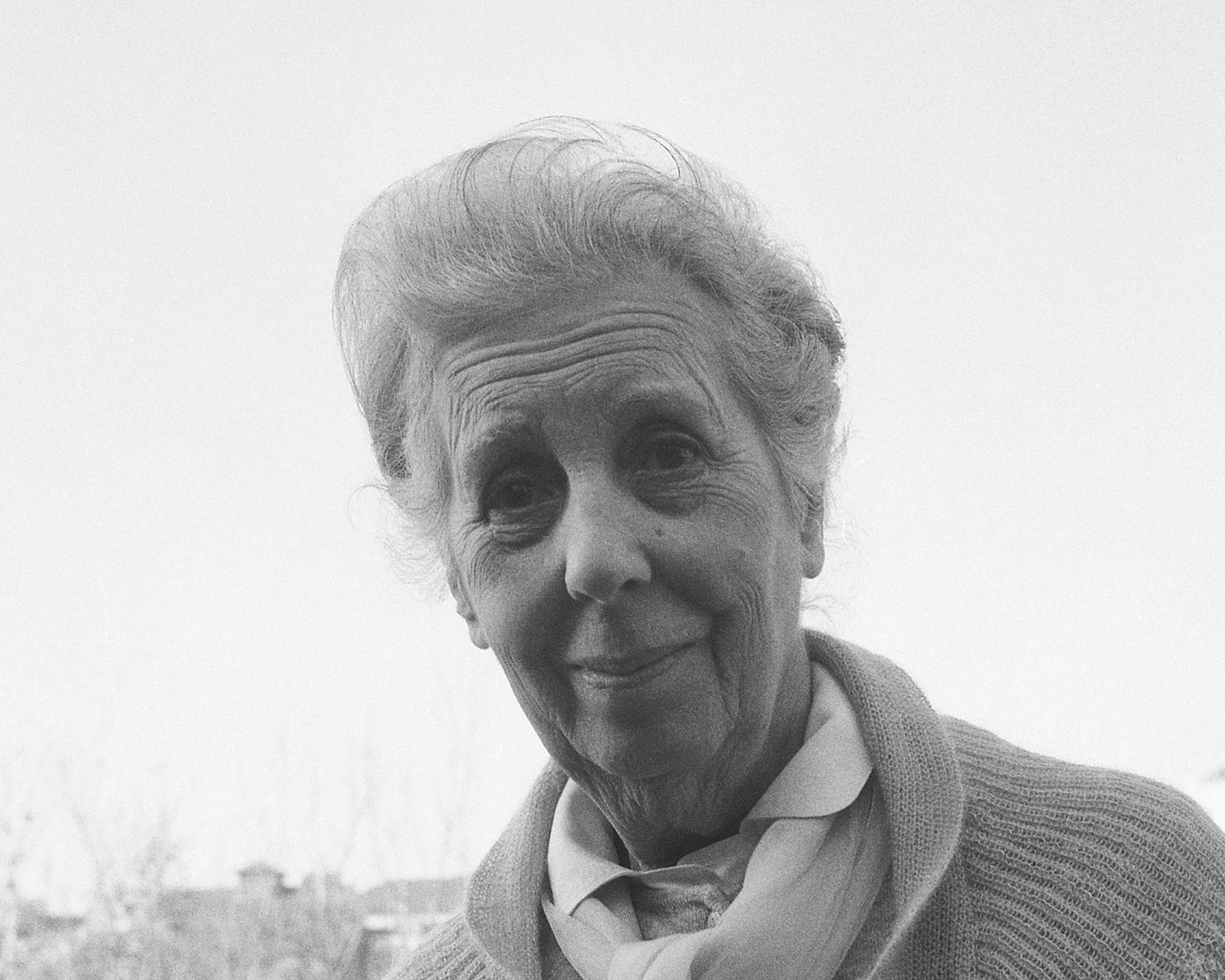
- Born: Maria Clementina Vilas Boas Carneiro de Moura; 25 September 1898; Lisbon, Portugal
- Died: 18 July 1992 (aged 93); Lisbon
- Known for: Painting; study of traditional arts
- Style: Modernist

Clementina Carneiro de Moura (1898-1992) was a Portuguese teacher, modernist painter and promoter of traditional arts.

== Early life ==
Maria Clementina Vilas Boas Carneiro de Moura was born in Lisbon, Portugal on 25 September 1898, the daughter of João Lopes Carneiro de Moura and Elvira Vilas Boas. She completed a painting course at the Lisbon School of Fine Arts in 1920, where she was a student of the Portuguese realist painter Columbano Bordalo Pinheiro and colleague of the modernist painter Sarah Affonso. That same year she visited Paris, where she first met the Portuguese painter and cartoonist Abel Manta, who she would marry in 1927. Their son, João Abel Manta, would become particularly famous as a cartoonist during the dying days of the authoritarian Estado Novo regime.

== Artistic activities ==
Carneiro de Moura spent a large part of her life as a secondary-school teacher, while also practicing her art and, from 1920, taking part in numerous exhibitions, particularly those of the SNBA, the Sociedade Nacional de Belas Artes (National Society of Fine Arts). In 1940 she worked on the decoration of the Orient Pavilion at the Portuguese World Exhibition (Exposição do Mundo Português), held in Belém on the River Tagus near Lisbon. This was staged to commemorate the foundation of the nation in 1140 and the regaining of its independence from Spain in 1640 but was also an opportunity to promote the ideology of the Estado Novo. At the same time, the SNBA exhibitions brought together avant-garde painters, where the neorealist tendency condemned by the Salazarist Estado Novo dominated.

Self-portrait of the artist with her son

In 1947 she travelled throughout the country, investigating Portuguese decorative arts, namely the production of quilts, embroidery and traditional lace. Several publications resulted from this research. She became a world export on embroidery, particularly for quilts or bedspreads, and also travelled outside Portugal to research the topic. Her interest in Portuguese crafts was part of a movement among artists in Europe and elsewhere to preserve and renew traditional techniques, promoted by artists such as Sonia Delaunay and Sophie Taeuber-Arp. Although some of her research was published by the Estado Novo's Mocidade Portuguesa Feminina (MPF - Female Youth Movement), she and her family remained constant opponents of the dictatorship. She belonged to the Associação Feminina Portuguesa para a Paz (Portuguese Women's Peace Association - AFPP) in the 1940s and 1950s and to the Conselho Nacional das Mulheres Portuguesas (CNMP - National Council of Portuguese Women), which was closed down by the Estado Novo in 1947. Before its closure the CNMP, under the guidance of Maria Lamas, organised an exhibition of three thousand books by 1400 women authors from thirty countries, which filled the Great Hall of Fine Arts at the University of Lisbon. Together with two others, Carneiro de Moura made portraits of more than one hundred famous women, which covered the walls of the SNBA hall. She was the first woman to hold a management position at the SNBA, from 1950 to 1954.

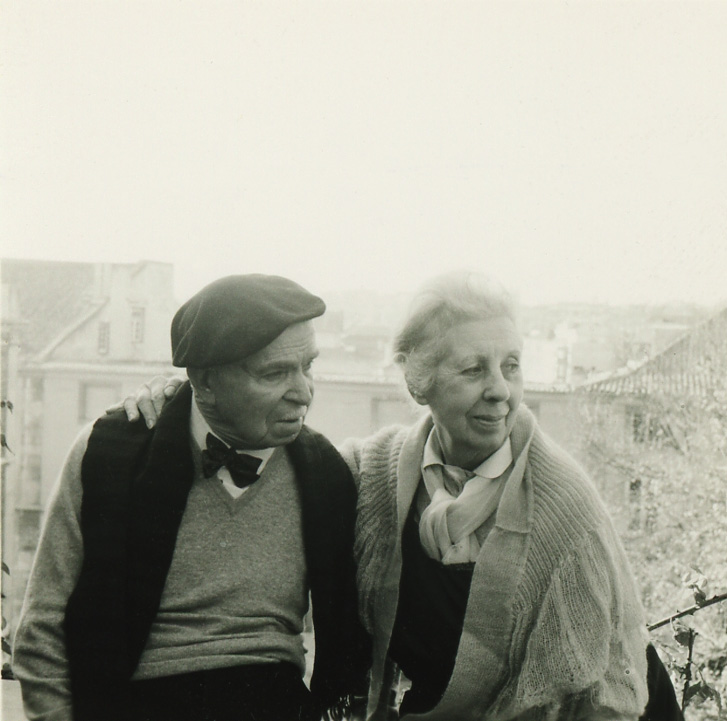
With her husband, Abel Manta

== Later life ==
After the Carnation Revolution on 25 April 1975 she joined the MDM, the Movimento Democrático de Mulheres (Women’s Democratic Movement), and regularly participated in the life of the Movement, helping to organize exhibitions at the MDM's headquarters, including her only solo painting exhibition in 1989.

Clementina Carneiro de Moura died on 18 July 1992 in Lisbon. Her work is represented in public and private collections, including the Centro de Arte Moderna of the Calouste Gulbenkian Foundation in Lisbon. In 2013 the Cascais Cultural Centre held an exhibition of her work together with that of her husband, son (João Abel Manta) and granddaughter (Isabel Manta).
