= Joaquim Tenreiro =

Brazilian furniture designer (1906–1922)

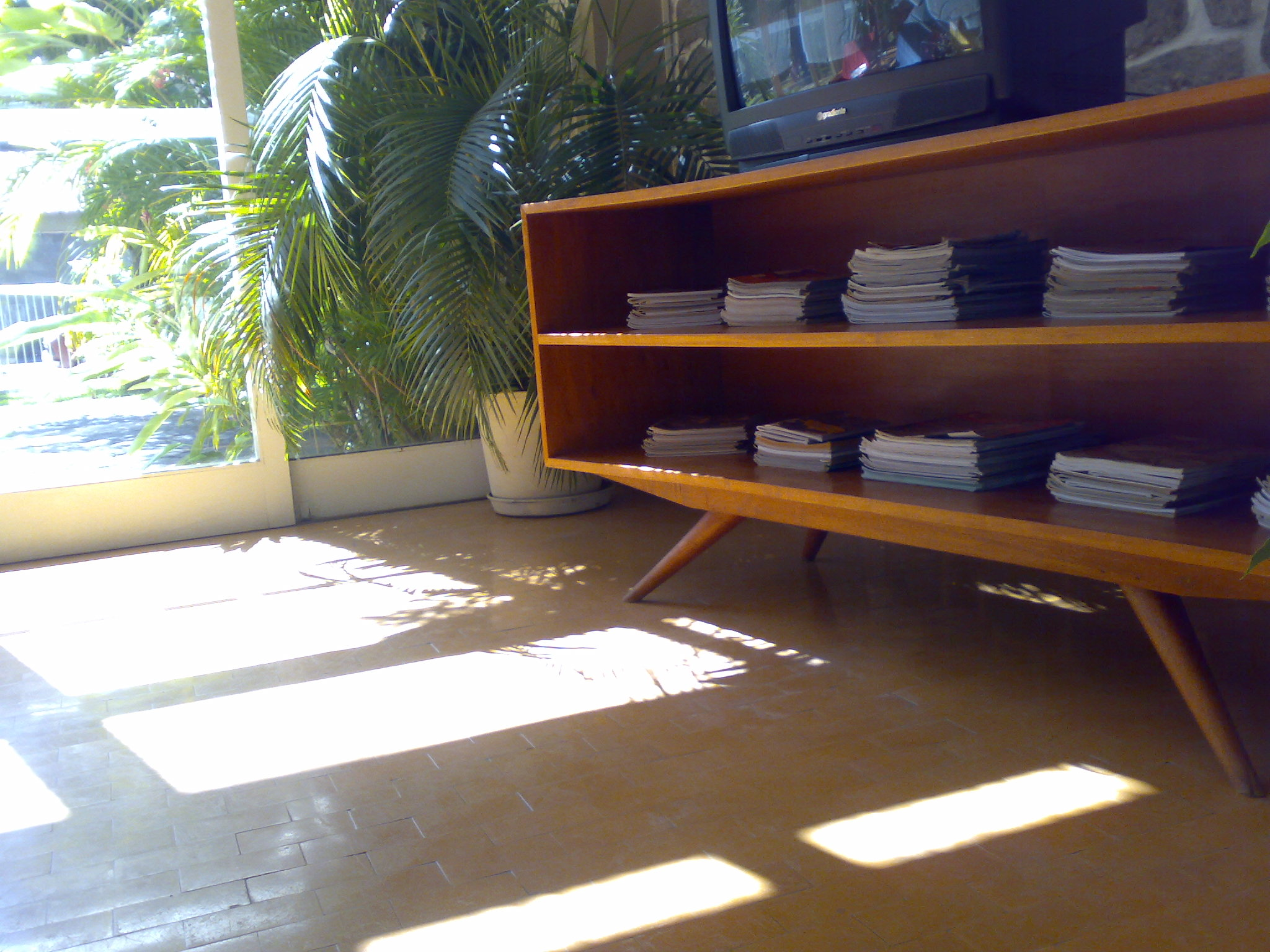
- Cabinet designed by Joaquim Tenreiro in the hall of the Hotel Cataguases.
- Born: 1906; Melo, Gouveia, Portugal
- Died: 1992 (aged 85–86); Itapira, Brazil
- Notable work: Poltrona Leve, Cadeira de Embalo
- Movement: European modernism

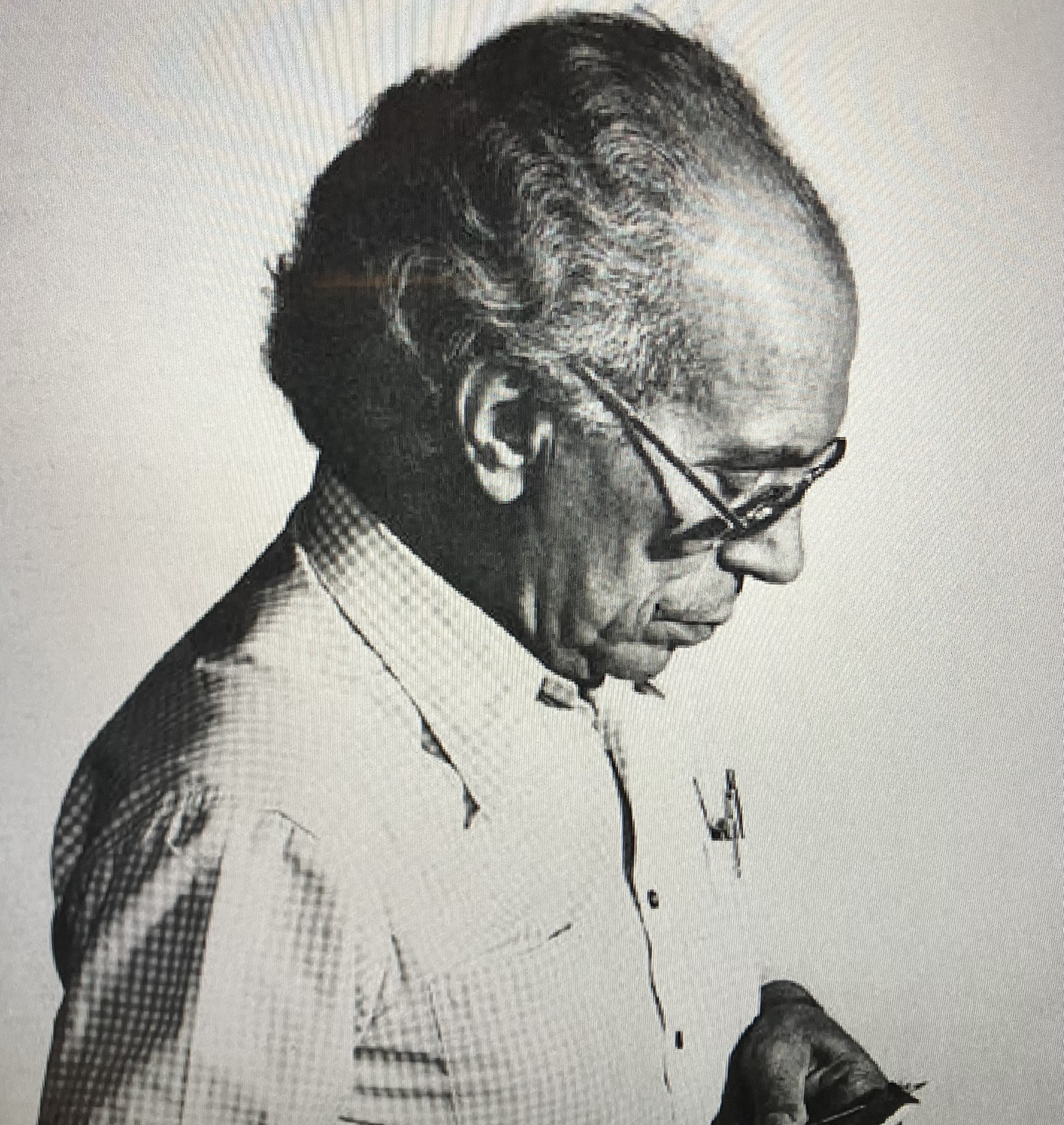
Joaquim Tenreiro

Joaquim Tenreiro (1906–1992) was among the leading furniture designers and visual artists in mid-20th century Brazil.

Tenreiro was born in Melo, Gouveia Municipality, Portugal into a family of woodworkers and carpenters. In the late 1920s, he emigrated to Rio de Janeiro and began working for the firm of Laubisch Hirth.

In the early 1940s, Tenreiro was among the first designers in the Brazilian furniture industry to adopt a European modernist vernacular. His initial efforts, including the 1942 "Poltrona Leve," met with considerable success, and in 1943 he established his own firm with factories in Rio de Janeiro and São Paulo. One of his main clients was Brazilian architect Oscar Niemeyer, for whose houses a number of pieces were originally commissioned.

Taking advantage of indigenous Brazilian hardwoods and designing with the Brazilian climate in mind by keeping pieces light, and often using wicker or cane, Tenreiro evolved a distinctive style suited to local conditions. His 1947 "Cadeira de Embalo" (Rocking Chair) is still in production. An example of his iconic "three-legged chair" sold at auction in 2008 for over US$90,000.

Tenreiro gave up the furniture business in the late 1960s to concentrate on his painting and sculpture, in which he had been engaged privately for many decades. He died in Itapira, Brazil, aged 86.

== Exhibitions (catalogues) ==
- Joaquim Tenreiro: esculpinturas, Galeria Bonino, (Rio de Janeiro 1975).
- Ascânio MMM; Ronaldo do Rego Macedo; João Fortes Engenharia: Joaquim Tenreiro: madeira/arte e design, Galeria de Arte do Centro Empresarial Rio, (Rio de Janeiro 1985).
- Tenreiro: Soraia Cals; André Seffrin; Maria Cecília Loschiavo dos Santos; Mário Grisolli, Bolsa de Arte do Rio de Janeiro (1998).
- Joaquim Tenreiro 1906-1992 : Artifice e design, Fundaçao Ricardo do Espirito Santo Silva, 1999, 55 p.
