= Abel Manta =

Portuguese architect, painter

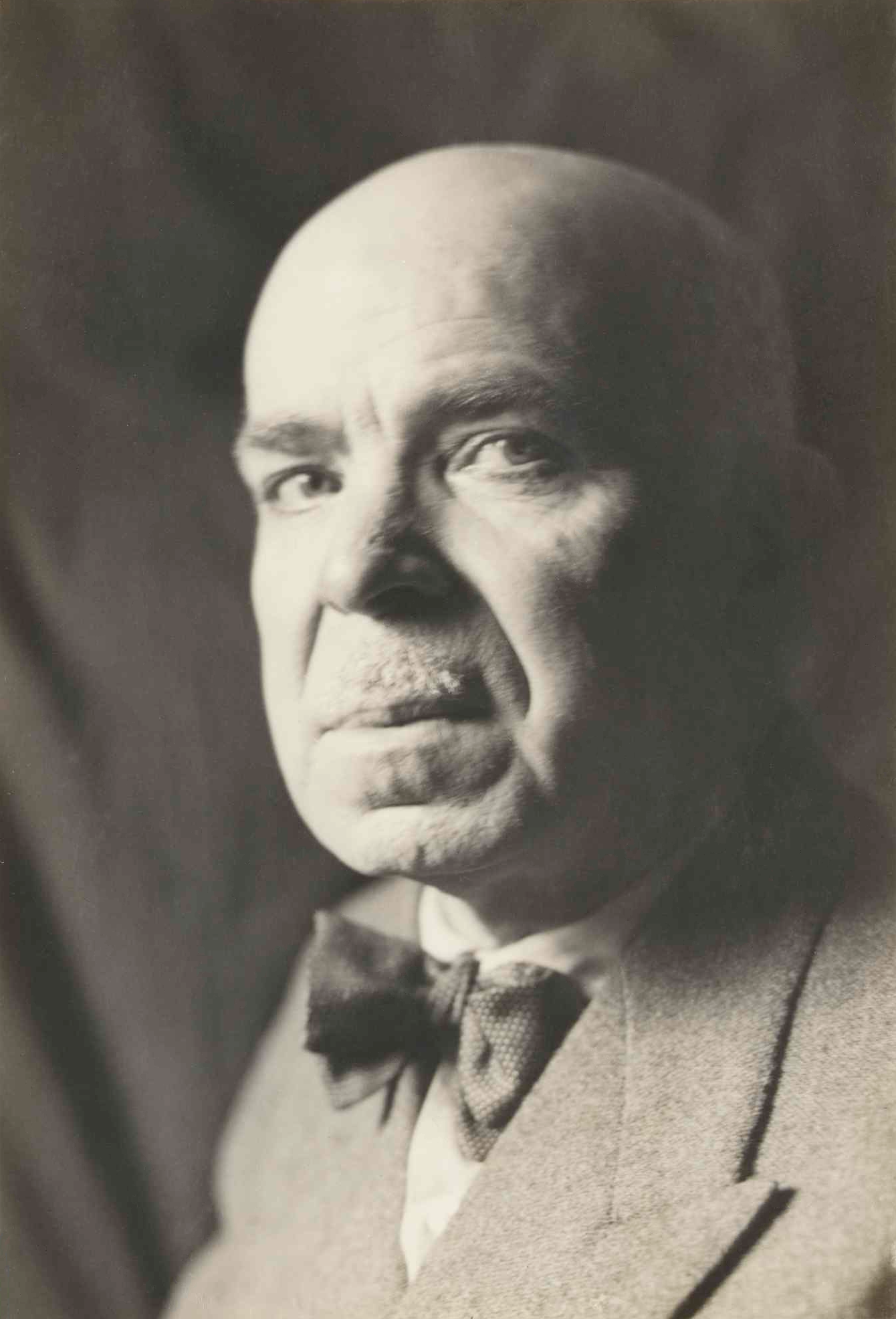
- Born: October 12, 1888; Gouveia, Portugal
- Died: August 9, 1982 (aged 93); Lisbon, Portugal
- Education: Lisbon School of Fine Arts
- Known for: Architecture, painting, design, cartooning
- Spouse: Clementina Carneiro de Moura

Abel Manta (12 October 1888 in Gouveia – 9 August 1982 in Lisbon) was an architect, painter, designer, and Portuguese cartoonist.

Between 1908 and 1915 Manta attended the Lisbon School of Fine Arts, completing the course in painting, having won the third Prize of the National Society of Fine Arts.

In 1919 he went to Paris participating in the "Salon de la Société Nationale" among other galleries, having also attended the course of engraving with William Schlumberger. While there he met his wife, the Portuguese artist Clementina Carneiro de Moura.

He made several trips to study in Europe.
