= P Vijay Kumar =

Indian footballer (1958–2015)

Personal information
- Birth name: Vijay
- Date of birth: 1 April 1958
- Place of birth: Jamshedpur, India
- Date of death: 19 November 2015 (aged 57)
- Place of death: Jamshedpur, India

Senior career*
Years	Team	Apps	(Gls)
- Mohammedan

International career
- India
- * Club domestic league appearances and goals

P Vijay Kumar (1 April 1958 – 19 November 2015) was an Indian footballer who represented the country at the international level.

Born and brought up in Jamshedpur, he originally hailed from Andhra Pradesh. Kumar joined Tata Steel in 1977.

The former international player had been an influential figure with the Tata Football Academy (TFA).

He was part of the national squad in the SAF Games in Calcutta in 1987, besides turning out in three Nehru Cup matches (1987–89) in Calicut, Calcutta and Siliguri. Kumar scored in an exhibition match against Bochum team of West Germany at Jamshedpur in 1986. He also played for the country in the Asia Cup (Singapore) in 1988.

== Coaching career ==
Kumar has cleared the Asian Football Confederation (AFC) A Licence coaching course, making him eligible to coach in the national soccer circuit.

Kumar has cleared the exam conducted by All India Football Federation for coaches hired in professional clubs. He cleared the C and B Licence courses in 1997 and 2006, respectively.

== Death ==
Kumar died 19 November 2015.
