= Master of Lourinhã =

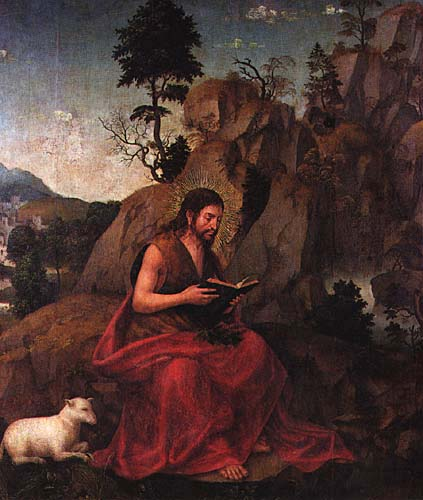
Master of Lourinhã: John the Baptist in the wilderness

The Master of Lourinhã (Portuguese: Mestre da Lourinhã) was a Portuguese painter of religious scenes active between 1510 and 1525. He might have been of North Netherlandish origin. He has been named after the church Santa Casa da Misericórdia in Lourinhã, Lisbon District, where two of his paintings are exhibited.
