= A. Rahim (footballer) =

British Indian footballer

Rahim
Personal information
- Full name: A. Rahim
- Date of birth: 1913
- Place of birth: Bezwada, British India
- Date of death: 1963 (aged 49–50)
- Place of death: Unknown
- Height: 5 ft 5 in (1.65 m)
- Position: Inside right

Senior career*
Years	Team	Apps	(Gls)
1935–1940s	Mohammedan Sporting		

International career
1936–1938	India	6	(5)
- * Club domestic league appearances and goals

A. Rahim, was a former footballer, who was prominently remembered for being a part of the Mohammedan Sporting in their Golden Age. Rahim was known for his renowned performances for the club, along with his dribbling and playmaking abilities.

== Club career ==
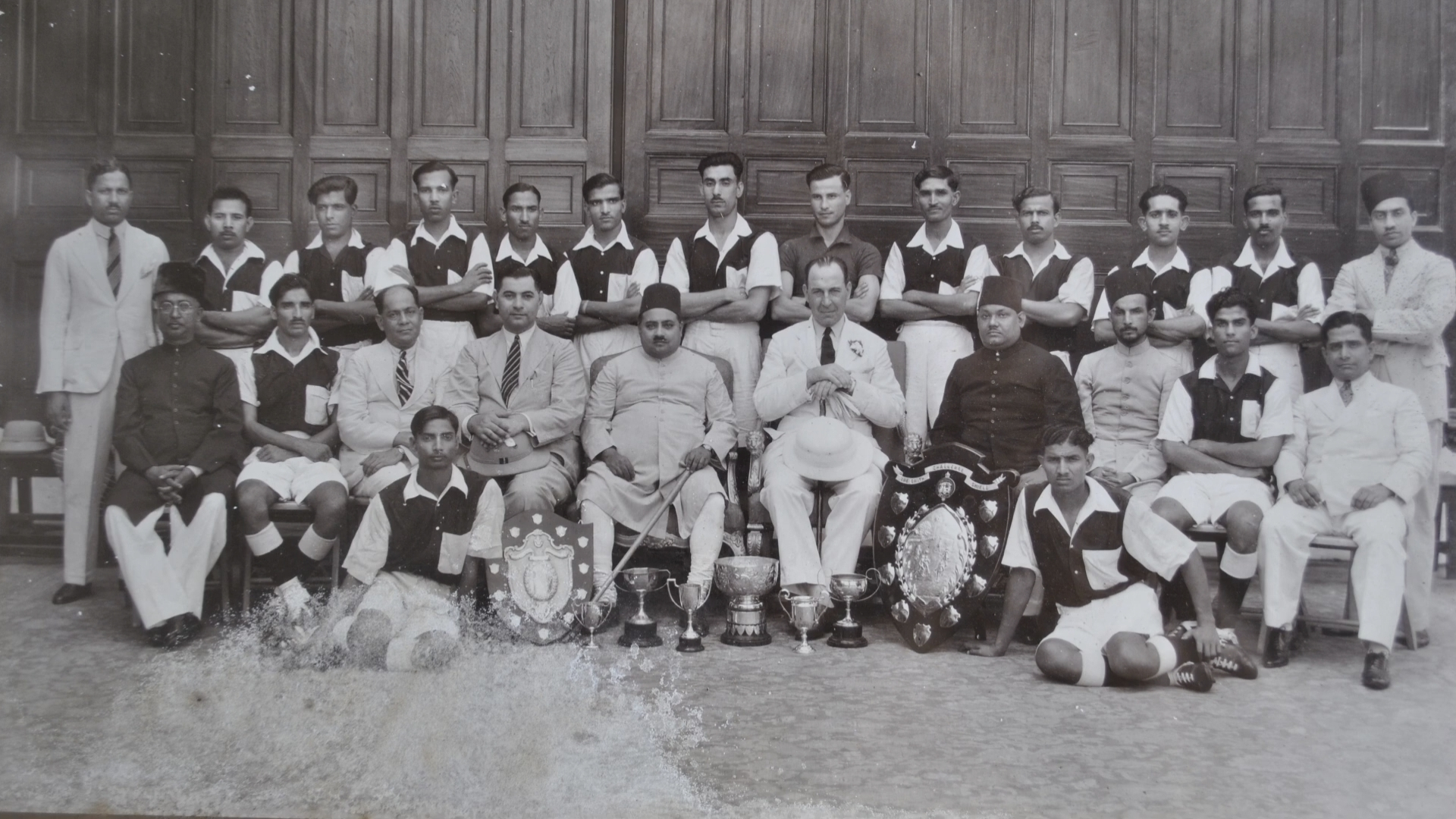
Rahim (standing fifth from left, standing row) with Mohammedan Sporting in 1935.

Rahim began playing football in the Bezwada region for local clubs, before being recruited to join the infamous Mohammedan Sporting Club of Calcutta in 1935. Contributing as an influential player for the club over those years, being a part of the "Three R's" of the forward line, which was Rahim, Rahmat, and Rashid Sr..

In 1936, Rahim played an instrumental role in the IFA Shield, scoring in the final alongside Rashid Jr.. Rahim was also the top goal-scorer in 1937 and 1938, with 12 and 18 goals goals respectively.

== International career ==
Rahim made his international debut for India on 4 July 1936, in an friendly against the Chinese Olympic team, at the Calcutta FC Ground in front of 100,000 spectators.

Two years later, Rahim was a part of the Indian XI which toured Australia, in the tour, he would manage to find the back of the net in the first three matches against Australia. The team would then travel to Colombo, where they would play against All-Ceylon XI, winning 3–0 with Rahim scoring twice along with a goal from S. Chowdhury.

== Death ==
Rahim passed away in 1963, at the age of 50.
