= Cascais Cultural Centre =

Cultural centre in Portugal

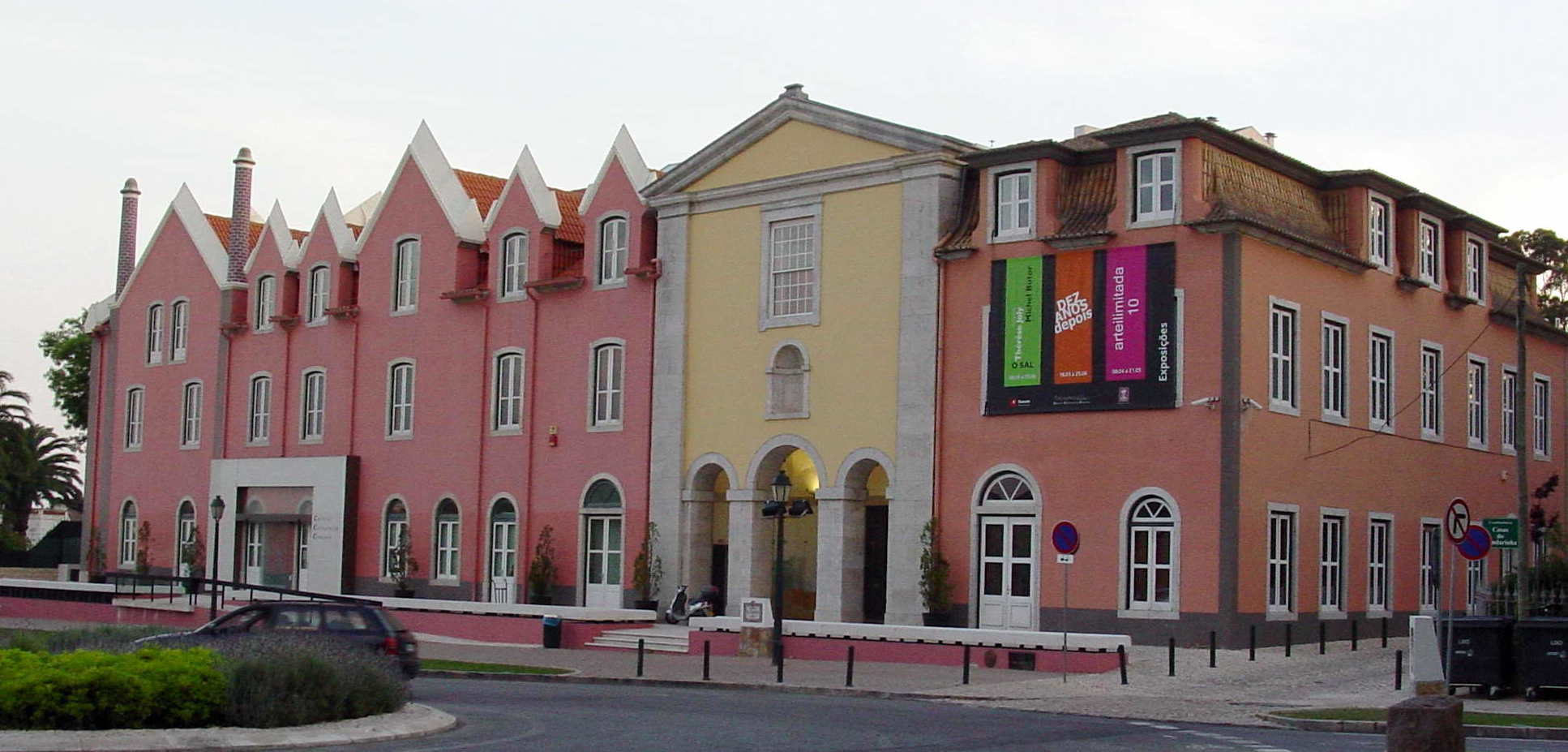
- Established: 2000
- Coordinates: 38.694°N 9.4211°W
- Curator: Dom Luis I Foundation
- Website: https://www.fundacaodomluis.pt/centro-cultural-de-cascais

The Cascais Cultural Centre (Centro Cultural de Cascais) is situated close to the Citadel of Cascais in the municipality of Cascais in the Lisbon district of Portugal. It consists of several exhibition spaces, a recital hall and a restaurant. Opened in May 2000, parts of the building date back to the end of the 16th century, when it was constructed as a Carmelite monastery. The Centre is managed by the Dom Luís I Foundation.

== Early history of the building ==
The construction of the convent or monastery of Nossa Senhora da Piedade was started in 1594. Its patron was Dom António de Castro, Lord of Cascais and Count of Monsanto. It was occupied in an unfinished form by friars of the Order of the Discalced Carmelites from 1596, being initially intended for the training of novices. Works were not completed until 1641 due to restrictions on building activities to ensure it would, if necessary, be possible to expand the fortress standing on the site that is now the Cascais Citadel. When the convent was finished in 1641 it also included Portugal's first college of philosophy. In 1673 several paintings about the life of Saint Teresa of Ávila, founder of the Discalced Carmelites, were done by Josefa de Óbidos. The convent was badly damaged by the 1 November 1755 Lisbon earthquake. In 1758 it was recorded that it had 35 monks who lived on alms from the people of Cascais. By 1777 the convent had an apothecary, which seems to have had a local monopoly on the sale of Água de Inglaterra, a medicine containing quinine that was used for the treatment of malaria.

== 19th and 20th centuries ==
In 1834, following the dissolution of the monasteries in Portugal, the buildings were expropriated, abandoned and then fell into ruin. The paintings by Josefa de Óbidos were transferred to the nearby Church of Nossa Senhora da Assunção. The property was sold by the government in 1864 and in 1874 it was purchased by the Viscount of Gandarinha, who built a summer home on the site. From 1870 the royal family started spending part of the summer in Cascais and Portuguese nobility wished to be close to the king. The area around the Cultural Centre is still known as Gandarinha, and the name is also given to a large apartment building behind the Centre. In the mid-20th century, the property was purchased by the Espírito Santo family, which carried out improvements, particularly the renovation of the chapel. After the Carnation Revolution of 25 April 1974, the assets of Banco Espírito Santo and the family, which had been very close to the dictatorial Estado Novo regime, were taken over by the state and the building was initially used to house Portuguese returnees from the country's former colonies. In 1977 it was given by the government to Cascais, with management of the chapel passing to the local parish. Archaeological excavations began in 1992 and lasted until 1997. Restoration began in 1994.

== Cultural centre ==
The Cascais Cultural Centre opened on 15 May 2000. Now forming part of what is known as the Cascais Museum Quarter, it is a multidisciplinary space on three floors, particularly dedicated to the visual arts. The Centre has an auditorium in the former chapel, with a capacity of 144 seats, suitable for hosting seminars and recitals, as well as a restaurant/cafeteria in an interior courtyard. The Centre hosts several exhibitions by Portuguese and foreign artists and photographers every year and also has an exhibition of pieces from the collection of the Dom Luís Foundation, which runs the Centre. The Foundation was named after the former king because he was a talented artist and musician.
