= Gouveia, Portugal =

Gouveia
- Municipality
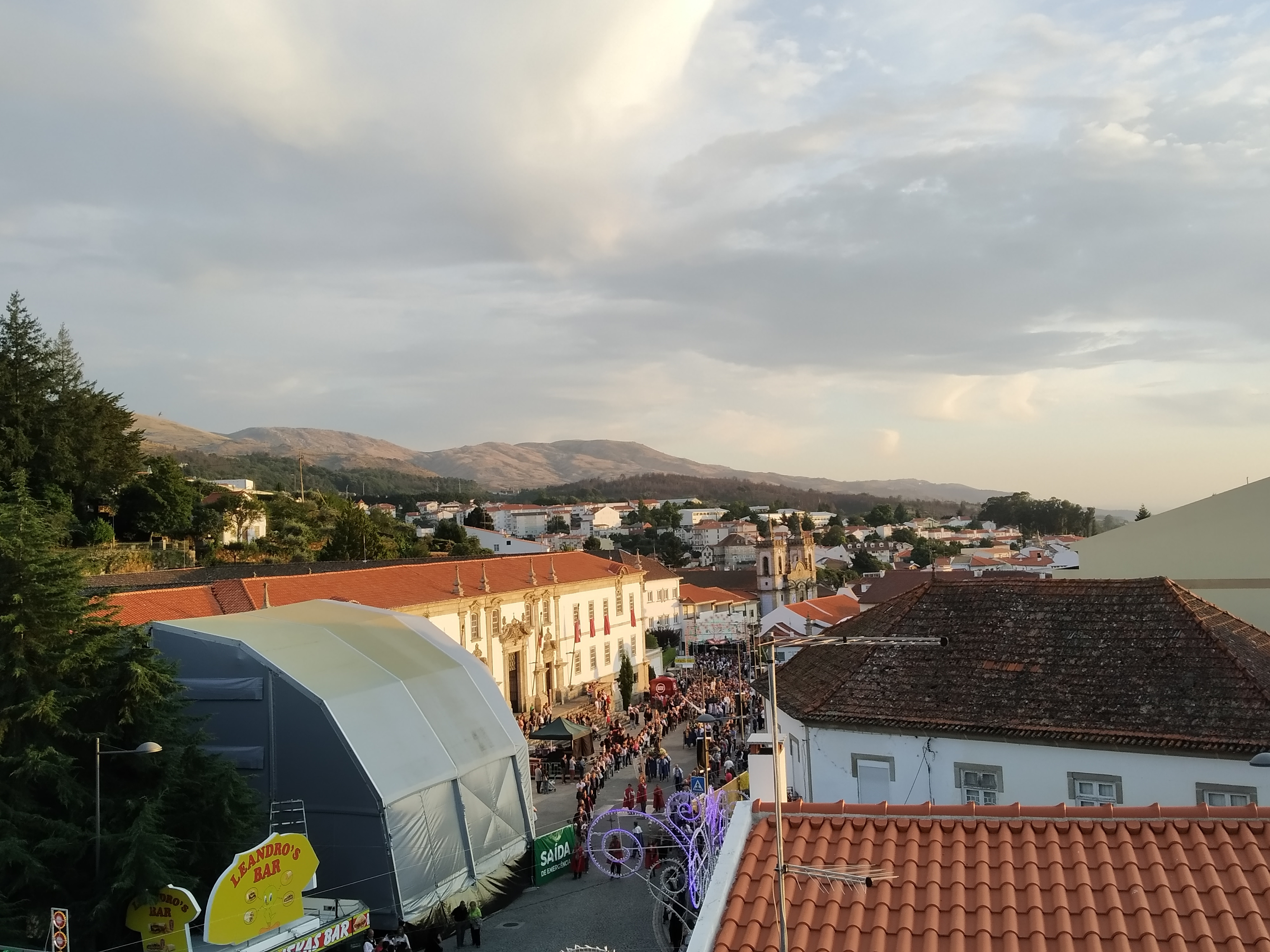

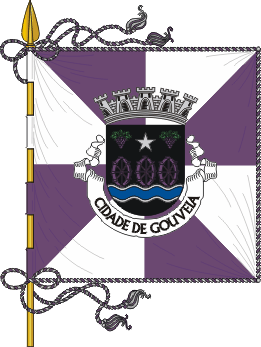
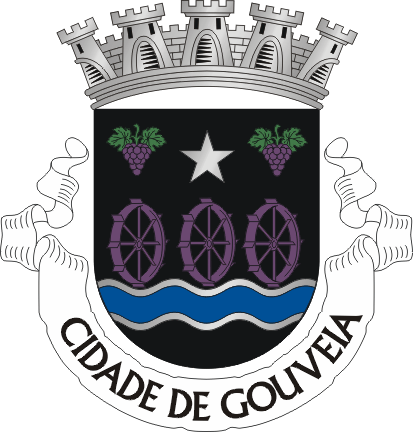
- Flag Coat of arms
- Interactive map of Gouveia
- Location in Portugal
- Coordinates: 40°30′N 7°36′W
- Country: Portugal
- Region: Centro
- Intermunic. comm.: Beiras e Serra da Estrela
- District: Guarda
- Parishes: 16

Government
  - President: Luis Tadeu (PSD)

Area
  - Total: 300.61 km^{2} (116.07 sq mi)

Population (2011)
  - Total: 14,046
  - Density: 46.725/km^{2} (121.02/sq mi)
- Time zone: UTC+00:00 (WET)
  - Summer (DST): UTC+01:00 (WEST)
- Local holiday: Monday after the 2nd Sunday of August
- Website: https://www.cm-gouveia.pt

Gouveia (European Portuguese pronunciation: [ɡoˈvɐjɐ]) is a city and a municipality in the district of Guarda in Portugal. The municipality population in 2011 was 14,046, in an area of 300.61 square kilometres (116.07 mi^{2}). The town itself has a very small population, around 3.500.

The present mayor is Luis Marques Tadeu, elected by the Social Democratic Party. The municipal holiday is the Monday after the 2nd Sunday of August.

== History ==
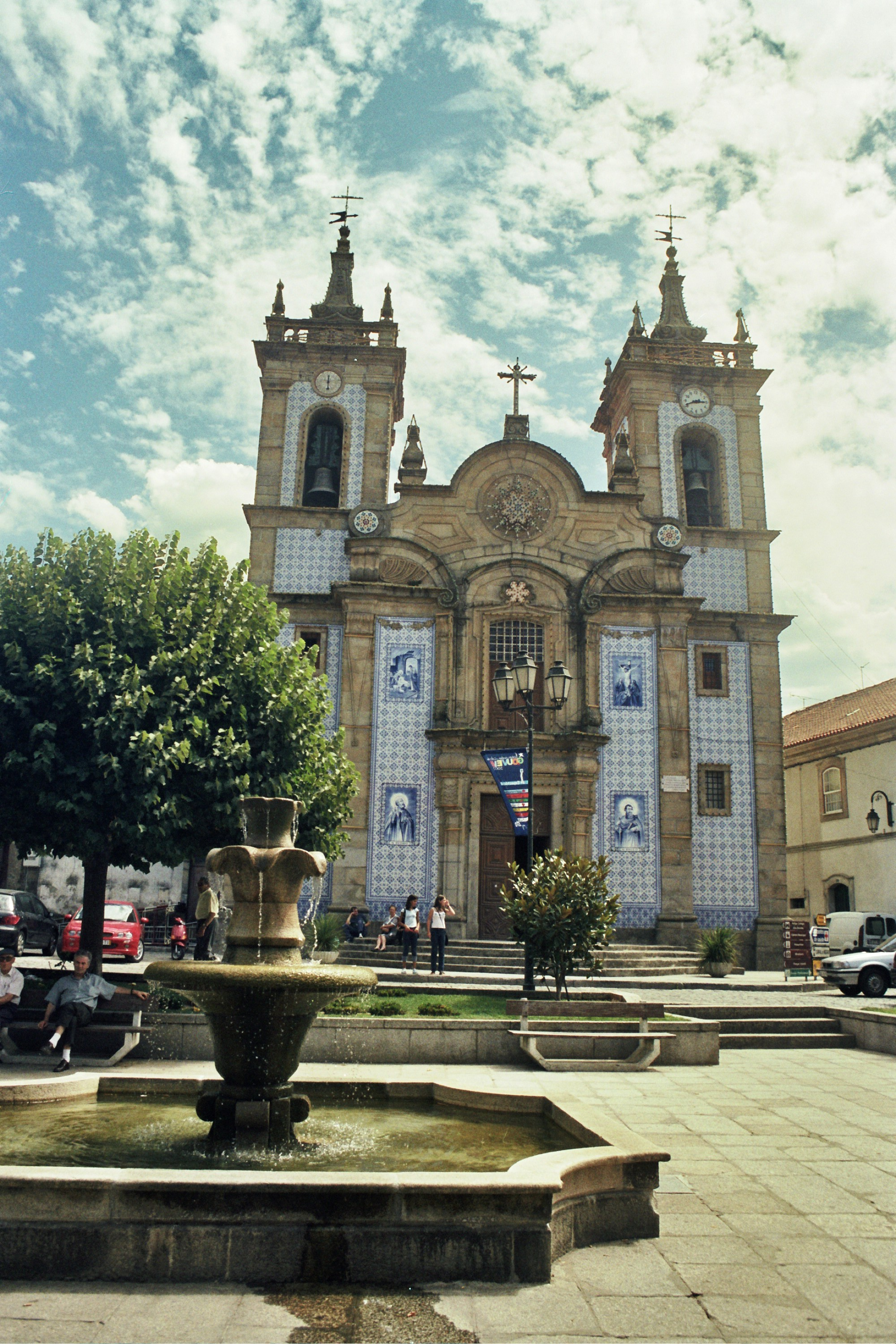
Gouveia, Portugal, a church with the façade covered with tiles (azulejos)

The establishment of Gouveia is often attributed to the year 580 BC, but the oldest material proof of human occupation is funerary pottery dating to the Bronze Age that was found in a castle square in 1940. In the parish of Rio Torto, the oldest evidence of human occupation is a dolmen (a stone funerary structure) dating back to the fourth millennium BC.

The Roman occupation was also a part of the city's history. A consecration inscription to the Lusitanian god Salqiu was found in a chapel on the city centre, as well as the grave of a Roman warrior with iron artefacts related to war (axe, knife, and an arrow head). In the Folgosinho, Nespereira, and V.N. Tazem parishes, there are Roman roads that can still be walked.

For the Germanic and Muslim periods, nothing is known except that in 1055 Ferdinand I from the Kingdom of Castile conquered "Gaudella" (Gouveia's Latin name) to the Muslims. In 1277 a battle during a civil war took place here.

During the Medieval period, the city developed, with shepherding, agriculture, and wool production as the biggest areas of economic development. The Jewish community played an important role in this development, especially in the handcrafts using wool, but also with trade. A Hebrew inscription was found in the late 1960s in one of the old Jewish quarters that certifies the last synagogue to be built in Portugal before the mandatory conversion and expulsion of the Jewish community of Portugal in the year of 1496, which is also the year recorded in the inscription. The inscription can be seen in the museum Espaço Arte e Memória.

During the modern period, the wool industry grew until the 20th century, since which time it has diminished. Gouveia in 1870 had 20 looms out of a national total of 57, and it was the sixth biggest textile urban centre. In 1873, there were 23 factories, employing almost 2000 people.

During the peninsular wars, Gouveia's castle was destroyed, but the medieval quarter survived, with its Jewish neighborhood of Biqueira, the S. Julian church, and urban characteristics. The main architectural structures are in the city centre, and they go back to the 18th century, especially the St. Peter's church, a small cathedral, the library and the museum building, the city hall, an 18th-century Jesuit college, and several churches and chapels. The biggest icon is a 16th-century building called casa da torre, which has a "pelourinho" in front from the same period as the building itself to commemorate the autonomy attained by Gouveia from King Manuel I.

== Geography ==
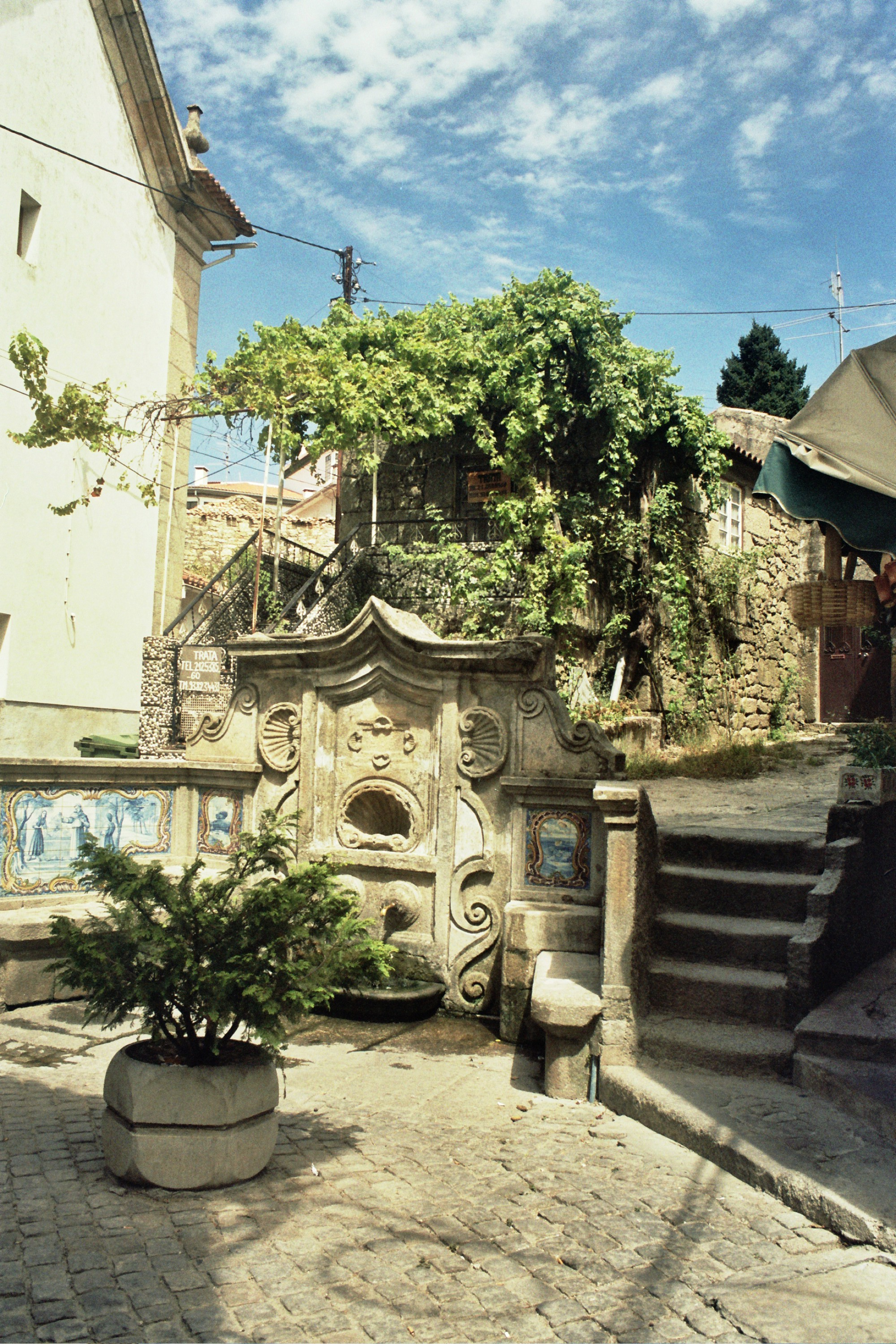
A street and public fountain in Gouveia, Portugal

Gouveia's location offers views over the Mondego valleys with the horizon dominated by the mountains and highlands of Beira Alta region. With wide horizons that allow people to have one of the widest views in Portugal over almost the entire Beira Alta region, Gouveia features a path to the highest geographic point of continental Portugal, with astonishing views over the valley. The biggest Portuguese river, Mondego, begins in a place called Mondeguinho (little mondego) in the heart of the national park of Serra da Estrela in Gouveia's administrative area.

The Ecological Park of Gouveia is located in a rural area just outside the city limits in Quinta da Borrachota. With an area of 6 hectares, the park has flora and fauna distributed along its paths as well as support infrastructures and information for visitors about the environmental region that surrounds the city.

Near by, CERVAS—Centro de Ecologia, Recuperação e Vigilância de Animais Selvagens (centre for ecology, recovery, and monitoring of wildlife centre)—has its installations. CERVAS is a national park of Serra da Estrela, managed by ALDEIA Association. Its goals are to identify and solve problems relating to the conservation and management of the wildlife and its habitats. The main focus of this work is related to the recovery and treatment of the wildlife and the release of individuals into the wild.

=== Parishes ===
Administratively, the municipality is divided into 16 civil parishes (freguesias):

- Aldeias e Mangualde da Serra
- Arcozelo
- Cativelos
- Figueiró da Serra e Freixo da Serra
- Folgosinho
- Gouveia (São Pedro e São Julião)
- Melo e Nabais
- Moimenta da Serra e Vinhó
- Nespereira
- Paços da Serra
- Ribamondego
- Rio Torto e Lagarinhos
- São Paio
- Vila Cortês da Serra
- Vila Franca da Serra
- Vila Nova de Tazem

== Culture ==
The municipality promotes an annual literary and painting award named after two of the greatest 20th-century Portuguese authors and artists as an homage to their home town: writer, philosopher, and teacher Vergílio Ferreira (born in Melo, Gouveia) and painter Abel Manta (also born in Gouveia).

Both of them also lend their names to public buildings: the municipal library, installed on an 18th-century palace from the old Gouveia marquis, is named after Ferreira and contains his private archive, and the municipal museum of modern art, also on an 18th-century palace built by a count, is named after Manta. With the biggest modern art archive of the region, the museum has paintings from Julio Pomar, Paula Rêgo, Julio Resende, and Vieira da Silva, amongst others.

The city also has a theatre with regular film showings and theatre and music festivals, such as Gouveia Art'Rock, a progressive rock festival going back more than a decade, and a reference in the world within the genre.

== Notable people ==
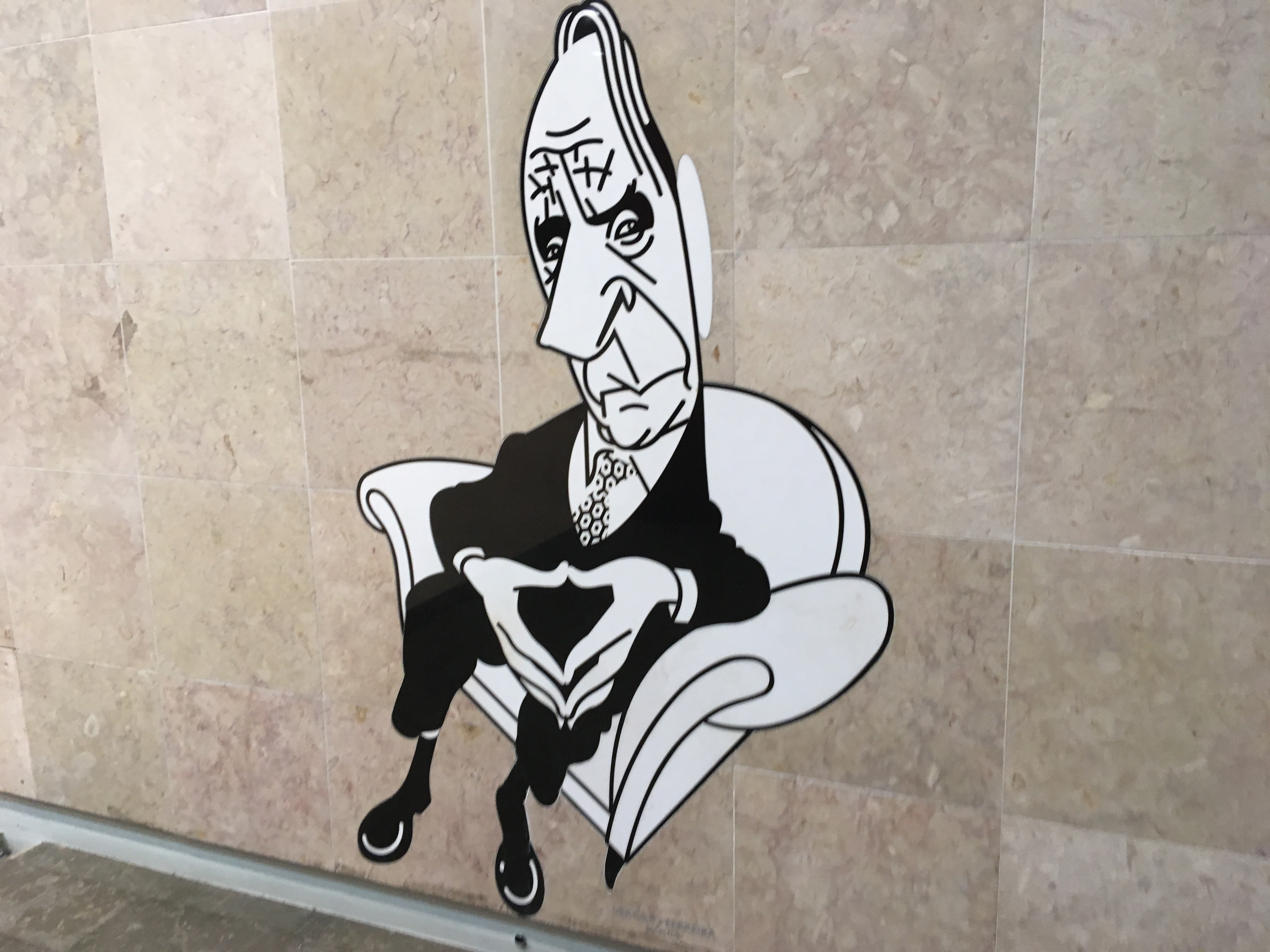
a cartoon of Vergílio Ferreira at Aeroporto metro station, Lisbon

- António Mendes Belo (1842–1929) a cardinal of the Roman Catholic Church and Patriarch of Lisbon from 1907 to 1929,
- Abel Manta (1888–1982) an architect, painter, designer and cartoonist.
- Joaquim Tenreiro (1906 in Melo – 1992) a furniture designer and visual artist in Brazil.
- Vergílio Ferreira (1916–1996) a writer and essayist, he wrote novels, short-stories novellas, philosophical essays and literary diaries, using neorealist and existentialist style
- Aureliano Veloso (1924–2019) a politician, the first democratically elected mayor of Porto in 1976–1980.
- António Pires Veloso (1926–2014) a general in the Portuguese Army, the final Governor and High Commissioner of São Tomé and Príncipe, 1974/5 and a candidate in the 1980 Portuguese presidential election
- Sílvia Rebelo (born 1989) a footballer with 108 caps for Portugal women
- Ana Borges (born 1990) a footballer with 131 caps with Portugal women

== Sister cities ==
- Danbury, Connecticut
