= Tarif Ahmed =

Indian footballer (born 1982)

Personal information
- Full name: Tarif Saikh Ahmed
- Date of birth: 2 May 1982 (age 44)
- Place of birth: Kolkata, West Bengal, India
- Position: Striker

Youth career
- Mohun Bagan

Senior career*
Years	Team	Apps	(Gls)
2002–2003	Mohun Bagan		
2003–2004	Mohammedan		
2004–2005	Tollygunge Agragami		
2005–2006	Mohammedan		
2006–2015	ONGC		
2007–2008	→ Mahindra United (loan)		
2015	Southern Samity		
2016–2017	ONGC		

International career
2006–2007	India	3	(0)
- * Club domestic league appearances and goals

Tarif Saikh Ahmed (Bengali: তারিফ শেখ আহমেদ; born 2 May 1982) is a former Indian professional footballer who played as a striker. He spent most of his career with Mumbai based club ONGC. He had also played for Mohun Bagan, Mohammedan S.C., Tollygunge Agragami, and Mahindra United. Ahmed also played internationally for India from 2006 to 2007.

== Club career ==
Born in Kolkata, West Bengal, Ahmed began his career with National Football League side Mohun Bagan after coming through their youth side. After just one season however, Ahmed left Mohun Bagan to join local rivals Mohammedan. He spent one season with Mohammedan before moving once again to Tollygunge Agragami. He scored his first goal in the National Football League with Tollygunge on 10 April 2005. His 83rd-minute goal against Churchill Brothers however was not enough as his side would lose 2–4. Tollygunge Agragami were then relegated after the 2004–05 season and Ahmed returned to Mohammedan who were promoted to the NFL themselves.

In 2007, Ahmed joined ONGC in Mumbai and joined Mahindra United on loan in the newly formed I-League. During the 2007–08 season, Ahmed scored just once, against Sporting Goa on 14 December 2007.

While with ONGC, Ahmed also represented West Bengal in the Santosh Trophy. In 2009, Ahmed helped ONGC earn promotion to the I-League by finishing as champions in the I-League 2nd Division. Ahmed also finished the season as the 2nd Division second best scorer. In 2012, Ahmed began to captain West Bengal in the Santosh Trophy.

In 2015, Ahmed moved back to West Bengal to play for Southern Samity in the Calcutta Football League. By 2017, Ahmed was back playing with ONGC in the local leagues.

== International career ==
Ahmed has three international caps representing India. He made his senior debut on 15 November 2006 in a 2007 AFC Asian Cup qualifier against Yemen. He came on as a substitute for Manjit Singh as India were defeated 1–2.

== Coaching career ==
In May 2019, Ahmed participated in the AIFF "D" Coaching License course in Kolkata.

== Personal life ==
Ahmed is the older brother of Indian international midfielder Jewel Raja.

== Career statistics ==
=== International ===
As of match played 29 August 2007

India national team
Year	Apps	Goals
2006	1	0
2007	2	0
Total	3	0

== Honours ==
índia

- Nehru Cup: 2007

ONGC

- I-League 2nd Division: 2010
