= Syed Abdus Samad (footballer) =

Indian footballer (1895–1965)

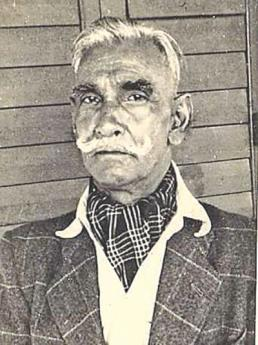
- Samad in an undated photograph

Personal information
- Date of birth: 6 December 1895
- Place of birth: Bhuri, Burdwan, West Bengal, Bengal Presidency, British India
- Date of death: 2 February 1965 (aged 69)
- Place of death: Parbatipur, Dinajpur, East Pakistan (present-day Bangladesh)
- Position: Forward

Youth career
- Purnia Junior FC

Senior career*
Years	Team	Apps	(Gls)
1912–1915	Calcutta Main Town Club		
1915–1920	Tajhat FC		
1918	Calcutta Orients Club		
1921–1930	East Bengal Railway		
1927	Victoria		
1931–1932	Mohun Bagan		
1933–1938	Mohammedan Sporting		

International career
1924–1934	India		
- * Club domestic league appearances and goals

Syed Abdus Samad (Bengali: সৈয়দ আবদুস সামাদ; 6 December 1895 – 2 February 1965) was a football player from Bengal. Dubbed "Football Jadukor" (lit. 'Football Magician'), he played for India national football team in 1924 and captained it in 1926. He played as a forward. After the partition of India in 1947, Samad settled in Dinajpur in East Pakistan, where he spent the rest of his life. He was recipient of the Pakistan Pride of Performance award in 1960.

Samad also played for Aryans Club, joining the team in 1915. His football career primarily lasted from 1915–1938.

== Early life ==
Samad was born in 1895 in Bhuri village of Burdwan, Bengal Presidency (now in West Bengal) in British India. His family later settled in Moulvitola in Purnia. He left school during his studies in the eighth grade. Samad displayed his talents in football from his early boyhood, and was influenced by headmaster of his school – Piyare Mohan Mookherji. Beside football, he began playing both cricket and tennis. Samad's father Syed Fazlul Bari was a government employee while his grandfather had been posted as "Sadre Alaa" (a higher judicial post at that time).

== Club career ==
=== Youth career ===
Samad played football for Purnia Zilla School in interschool tournament, and he scored all ten goals for his team in their 10–0 win against Umapati Kumar's Kishanganj Higher English School in a match. He also helped his school team winning the prestigious Fawcus Cup. He first drew attention of the football club managers of Calcutta when he played for the Purnia Junior Football Club.

=== Senior career ===
He joined the Calcutta Main Town Club in 1912. During 1915–1920, he played for Tajhat Football Club of Rangpur. Dukhiram Majumder was one of founding members of Aryan Club in 1888, was responsible for bringing up players like Samad. Samad also took first football training from him. In 1927, he joined Victoria Sporting Club of Dhaka. In 1916, Samad played in a match against Somerset Football Team of England. And beat them by 4–1. He played for Calcutta Orients Club in 1918. He joined East Bengal Railway Club in 1921 and played until 1930. With the team, he won All-India Railway Championship thrice. At that time in 1927, the club achieved runner-up position in Durand Cup. Samad scored the most memorable trophy-winning goal of his career in 1927 against the Sherwood Forestry Team patronised by the Chief of the British Indian Army Lieutenant General Sherwood Mall.

Off Samad the less said the better. Suffice it to say that on his day he would have walked into a world eleven. Yes, on his day!

— Pankaj Gupta, legendary Indian sports administrator, on Samad.

In 1931, Mohun Bagan acquired the services of Samad, where he played alongside legendary players including Gostha Pal, Karuna Bhattacharya, Umapati Kumar, Sanmatha Dutta, Balaidas Chatterjee, Satu Chowdhury, and Bimal Mukherjee.

At the age of 38, he joined the Mohammedan Sporting Club and played in during 1933–1938, club's "golden age". In 1933, Mohammedan qualified for the first division of Calcutta Football League for the first time in its history. Mohammedan became the first native club to capture the Calcutta Football League title in 1934, in their very first year in top division which was a rare feat. The club became Senior Division champion five consecutive seasons (1934 to 1938). In 1936, Sporting became the second Indian club to win IFA Shield. In the same year, due to a serious injury, Samad's playing career came to an end. He retired from Mohammedan.

== International career ==
Samad made his international debut for India in 1924. As a member of the India national team, he toured Burma, Ceylon, Hong Kong, China, Java, Sumatra, Malay, Borneo, Singapore and the United Kingdom. In a match played against China in Peking, he played as a substitute player in the second half and scored four consecutive goals to give his side a 4–3 victory after trailing 0–3 in the first half.

== Personal life and legacy ==
After the partition of India in 1947, Samad settled in Parbatipur Upazila of Dinajpur in East Pakistan. He was employed at the Pakistan Eastern Railway as an inspector. Samad also served as chairman of the Pakistan National Sports Council Board. In 1957, he was appointed coach of National Sports Council Board's football section. He was recipient of the Pride of Performance (President's Award) in 1960.

Samad married Syeda Qamrunnisa on 12 October 1917. He had a son named Golam Hossain; together they played for Eastern Bengal Railway team in 1944. He died on 2 February 1965 in Parbatipur Upazila. The following year, a football tournament was held in his memory.

In 1969, Parbatipur Railway Institute was renamed to Samad Institute in his memory. East Pakistan (later Bangladesh) Government released a postal stamp commemorating him in 1969. Bangladesh Football Federation organizes the annual "Jadukar Samad Smriti Football Tournament". Later, the Government of Bangladesh also launched a postage stamp series in his memory. Later, Samad Milanayatan was built in his memory in Parbatipur, by the Bangladesh Railway. Samad Institute was also built in his memory in East Parbatipur.

== Honours ==
East Bengal Railway

- Durand Cup runner-up: 1927
- All India Railways Championship: thrice (years unknown)

Mohammedan Sporting

- Calcutta Football League: 1934, 1935, 1936, 1937, 1938
- IFA Shield: 1936

Individual

- Presidential Pride of Performance: 1960 (by the Government of Pakistan)

== See also ==
- History of Indian football
- History of the India national football team
- List of India national football team captains
- Football in Bangladesh

== Bibliography ==
- Majumdar, Boria; Mangan, J. A. (13 September 2013). Sport in South Asian Society: Past and Present. Oxford: Routledge. p. 117. ISBN 978-1-317-99894-5. Archived from the original on 3 November 2023.
- Kapadia, Novy (2017). Barefoot to Boots: The Many Lives of Indian Football. Penguin Random House. ISBN 978-0-143-42641-7.
- Martinez, Dolores; Mukharjiim, Projit B (2009). Football: From England to the World: The Many Lives of Indian Football. Routledge. ISBN 978-1-138-88353-6. Archived from the original on 2 July 2022.
- Mitra, Soumen (1 January 2006). In Search of an Identity: The History of Football in Colonial Calcutta. Kolkata: Dasgupta & Co. Private Ltd. ISBN 978-8182110229. Archived from the original on 21 October 2022.
- Dutta, P. L., Memoir of 'Father of Indian Football' Nagendraprasad Sarbadhikary (Calcutta: N. P. Sarbadhikary Memorial Committee, 1944) (hereafter Memoir)
- Sharma, Nikhil Paramjit; Gupta, Shantanu (4 February 2019). India's Football Dream. SAGE Publications India. ISBN 9789353283063. Archived from the original on 4 October 2022.
- Ghosh, Saurindra Kumar. Krira Samrat Nagendraprasad Sarbadhikary 1869–1940 (Calcutta: N. P. Sarbadhikary Memorial Committee, 1963) (hereafter Krira Samrat).
- Nath, Nirmal (2011). History of Indian Football: Upto 2009–10. Readers Service. ISBN 9788187891963. Archived from the original on 22 July 2022.
- Bolsmann, Chris; Vahed, Goolam (2 November 2017). "'They Are Fine Specimens of the Illustrious Indian Settler': Sporting Contact between India and South Africa, 1914–1955". Journal of Southern African Studies. 43 (6): 1273–1291. doi:10.1080/03057070.2017.1379689. ISSN 0305-7070. S2CID 148862123. Archived from the original on 3 October 2022.
- Dineo, Paul; Mills, James (2001). Soccer in South Asia: Empire, Nation, Diaspora. London, United Kingdom: Frank Cass Publishers. ISBN 978-0-7146-8170-2. Archived from the original on 25 July 2022.
- "Triumphs and Disasters: The Story of Indian Football, 1889—2000" (PDF). Archived from the original (PDF) on 13 August 2012.
- Mukhopadhay, Subir (2018). সোনায় লেখা ইতিহাসে মোহনবাগান (transl. Mohun Bagan in the history written in gold). ISBN 978-93-850172-0-9.
- Banerjee, Argha; Basu, Rupak (2022). মোহনবাগান: সবুজ ঘাসের মেরুন গল্প (transl. Mohun Bagan: Green fields' Maroon stories). Shalidhan. ISBN 978-81-954667-0-2.
- Majumdar, Boria; Bandyopadhyay, Kausik (2006). A Social History Of Indian Football: Striving To Score. Routledge. ISBN 9780415348355. Archived from the original on 29 June 2021.
- Basu, Jaydeep (2003). Stories from Indian Football. UBS Publishers' Distributors. ISBN 9788174764546. Archived from the original on 11 October 2022.
- Sen, Dwaipayan (2013). "Wiping the Stain Off the Field of Plassey: Mohun Bagan in 1911". In Bandyopadhyay, Kausik; Mallick, Sabyasachi (eds.). Fringe Nations in World Soccer. Routledge. ISBN 978-1-317-99810-5.
- Sen, Ronojoy (2015). "The Empire Strikes Back: The 1911 IFA Shield and Football in Calcutta". Nation at Play: A History of Sport in India. Columbia University Press. ISBN 978-0-231-16490-0.
- Karmakar, Rajat (21 December 2013). "ইস্টার্ন রেলওয়ে ফুটবল ক্লাব — ১৪১ বছরের পুরনো একটি ক্লাবের ইতিহাস ও ঐতিহ্য" [Eastern Railway Football Club — History and heritage of a 141-year-old club]. archives.anandabazar.com (in Bengali). Kolkata: Anandabazar Patrika. Archived from the original on 27 January 2022.
- Dulal, Mahmud (2020). খেলার মাঠে মুক্তিযুদ্ধ (transl. Liberation war in the playground) (in Bengali). Bishhoshahitto Bhobon. ISBN 978-984-8218-31-0.
- Alam, Masud (2017). ফুটবলের গল্প ফুটবলারদের গল্প (transl. The story of football the story of footballers) (in Bengali). Bishhoshahitto Bhobon. ISBN 9789849134688.
- "The passage of football in India". ifawb.org. Kolkata: Indian Football Association. Archived from the original on 29 January 2021.
- Alam, Dhrubo (16 July 2018). "Kick, Score, Scream! The History of Football in Dhaka". Dhaka: Ice Today. Archived from the original on 1 November 2019.
- Mukhopadhyay, Atreyo (4 May 2019). "When Swami Vivekananda claimed seven wickets and other Eden Gardens tales". newindianexpress.com. Kolkata: The New Indian Express. Express News Service. Archived from the original on 16 April 2023.
