= Umapati Kumar =

Indian footballer

Personal information
- Full name: Umapati Kumar
- Date of birth: 8 February 1898
- Place of birth: Burdwan, Bengal Presidency, British India
- Date of death: 20 November 1992 (aged 94)
- Place of death: Calcutta, West Bengal, India
- Position: Inside forward

Senior career*
Years	Team	Apps	(Gls)
1916–1936	Mohun Bagan		

International career
1923–1936	India		
- * Club domestic league appearances and goals

Umapati Kumar was a former footballer who played mostly as an inside forward. As a footballer, he represented India in international football, and Mohun Bagan AC in the Calcutta Football League.

== Personal life ==
Umapati Kumar was born on 8 February 1898 in Chagram, located in the Burdwan district of West Bengal. His father Rajanikanta Kumar was a barrister in Kishanganj, Purnia district, Bihar. The Kumar family was having their hereditary Khagra Nawab Estate Zamindari during Presidency rule under British Raj. By 1916, he completed his matriculation from Kishanganj Higher English School, and represented the school team in interschool football tournament. and came to Kolkata. In 1919, Kumar married Sailabala Devi and in 1920, he graduated from the Scottish Church College. One of his son, Bishwanath Kumar, was a sportsperson and represented Mohun Bagan alongside playing cricket and hockey.

== Playing career ==
Umapati Kumar is best remembered for his long and cherished career with Mohun Bagan AC. He joined the club as a youngster in 1916 and would continue to don the Green & Maroon jersey for more than two decades. Earlier coached by Dukhiram Majumder, Kumar played alongside some of the stars from Mohun Bagan's famous 1911 IFA Shield winning team, as well as later icons including Gostha Pal, Bimal Mukherjee, Satu Chowdhury, Balaidas Chatterjee, Karuna Bhattacharya, Dr. Sanmatha Dutta. He predominantly played inside left for the club with Syed Abdus Samad, and retired in 1936. In 1923, he was part of the Mohun Bagan team that defeated both the Calcutta Football League and IFA Shield winner Calcutta FC. In the same year, they met Calcutta FC again in the final of IFA Shield in their 3–0 defeat.

Kumar was also a regular participant in exhibition matches that took place in Kolkata like Indians vs Europeans and Civilians vs Military. Kumar captained the Indian team in these matches for four consecutive seasons and the Civilian team (which would also contain Europeans) for two consecutive seasons in 1926 and 1927. He was also an integral part of the IFA XI which toured Ceylon (Sri Lanka) and South Africa in the 1930s. On 4 July 1936, he played for India against visiting Chinese team in their 1–1 draw in Calcutta.

With Mohun Bagan, Umapati Kumar won Coochbehar Trophy six times and a host of other trophies. He was also the captain of the side which reached the 1923 IFA Shield final. After retirement, he remained closely associated with Mohun Bagan till his death, serving in a number of positions such as secretary, general secretary, treasurer and vice-president.

== Playing style ==
Umapati Kumar was one of the most skillful players of his generation and was well known for his passing range. He is often considered to be the first Indian footballer to have perfected the art of through passes. He was an intelligent, elegant footballer who was supremely fit. Despite playing without boots, kneecaps or anklets for most of his career Umapati Kumar never suffered from a long-term injury. Amrita Bazar Patrika once remarked that Kumar's skills and crafts were "as smooth as muslin".

== Post-playing career ==
After retiring from football, Kumar went on to began his administrative career in his club Mohun Bagan and served as both the football secretary and president. He later joined the governing body of the Indian Football Association (IFA) and also served as president of the Calcutta Referees' Association.

== Death and legacy ==
Kumar died on 20 November 1992 in Calcutta, aged 94. The Kolkata Municipal Corporation paid tribute to him by renaming a road "Umapati Kumar Sarani".

== Honours ==
Mohun Bagan

- Coochbehar Cup: 1916, 1931, 1935, 1936
- Asanullah Cup runner-up: 1916
- Rovers Cup runner-up: 1923
- IFA Shield runner-up: 1923

Individual

- "Mohun Bagan Ratna" in 2006, awarded by Mohun Bagan AC.

== See also ==
- History of Indian football
- Football in Kolkata
- History of the India national football team

== Bibliography ==
- Kapadia, Novy (2017). Barefoot to Boots: The Many Lives of Indian Football. Penguin Random House. ISBN 978-0-143-42641-7.
- Sen, Dwaipayan (2013). "Wiping the Stain Off the Field of Plassey: Mohun Bagan in 1911". In Bandyopadhyay, Kausik; Mallick, Sabyasachi (eds.). Fringe Nations in World Soccer. Routledge. ISBN 978-1-317-99810-5.
- Sen, Ronojoy (2015). "The Empire Strikes Back: The 1911 IFA Shield and Football in Calcutta". Nation at Play: A History of Sport in India. Columbia University Press. ISBN 978-0-231-16490-0.
- Bandyopadhyay, Kausik (2008). "Football in Bengali culture and society: a study in the social history of football in Bengal 1911–1980". Shodhganga. University of Calcutta. p. 35. hdl:10603/174532. Archived from the original on 7 October 2022.
- Mitra, Soumen (1 January 2006). In Search of an Identity: The History of Football in Colonial Calcutta. Kolkata: Dasgupta & Co. Private Ltd. ISBN 978-8182110229. Archived from the original on 21 October 2022.
- Martinez, Dolores; Mukharji, Projit B (2009). Football: From England to the World: The Many Lives of Indian Football. Routledge. ISBN 978-1-138-88353-6. Archived from the original on 2 July 2022.
- Nath, Nirmal (2011). History of Indian Football: Upto 2009–10. Readers Service. ISBN 9788187891963. Archived from the original on 22 July 2022.
- Dineo, Paul; Mills, James (2001). Soccer in South Asia: Empire, Nation, Diaspora. London, United Kingdom: Frank Cass Publishers. ISBN 978-0-7146-8170-2. Archived from the original on 25 July 2022.
- "Triumphs and Disasters: The Story of Indian Football, 1889—2000" (PDF). Archived from the original (PDF) on 13 August 2012.
- D'Mello, Anthony (1959). Portrait Of Indian Sport. P R Macmillan Limited, London.
- Bolsmann, Chris; Vahed, Goolam (2 November 2017). "'They Are Fine Specimens of the Illustrious Indian Settler': Sporting Contact between India and South Africa, 1914–1955". Journal of Southern African Studies. 43 (6): 1273–1291. doi:10.1080/03057070.2017.1379689. ISSN 0305-7070. S2CID 148862123. Archived from the original on 3 October 2022.
- Mukhopadhay, Subir (2018). সোনায় লেখা ইতিহাসে মোহনবাগান (transl. Mohun Bagan in the history written in gold). ISBN 978-93-850172-0-9.
- Banerjee, Argha; Basu, Rupak (2022). মোহনবাগান: সবুজ ঘাসের মেরুন গল্প (transl. Mohun Bagan: Green fields' Maroon stories). Shalidhan. ISBN 978-81-954667-0-2.
