= Aryan FC =

Indian multi-sports club based in Kolkata

Aryan এরিয়ান
- Full name: Aryan Football Club
- Founded: 1884; 142 years ago (as Aryan Sports Club)
- Ground: East Bengal Ground
- Capacity: 23,500
- Owner: Techno India Group
- Chairman: Satyam Roy Chowdhury
- Head coach: Rajdeep Nandy
- League: CFL Premier Division
Home colours	Away colours

Aryan Football Club (Bengali: এরিয়ান ফুটবল ক্লাব) (also known as Aryans and Aryan; and Techno Aryan Football Team for sponsorship reasons) is an Indian professional multi-sports club based in Kolkata, West Bengal, known predominantly for its association football section. The club competes in the Calcutta Football League, the oldest football league in Asia.

Founded in 1884 as "Aryan Sports Club", it started playing football some years later, making it one of Asia's oldest football clubs. It plays home matches at the East Bengal Ground.

== History ==
=== Formation and journey (1884–1930) ===
During the age of associations of Bengali nationalism in late 19th century, Sir Dukhiram Majumder, Kalicharan Mitra, Manmatha Ganguly were the pupils of Nagendra Prasad Sarbadhikari, who practiced and popularized football. Majumder founded a sporting organization named "Students Union" in Mohun Bagan Villa. When the organization discontinued due to disagreements over wearing boots, Majumder went on to form Aryans Club in Maharaja Durga Charan Laha's Telipara field in Shyampukur. Before the advent of East Bengal and Mohammedan Sporting, it was Aryan (then known as Aryans Club) and Mohun Bagan, who enjoyed an elite status among Indian football clubs. Founded in 1884 as a multi-sports club, association football was introduced in Aryan few years later and thus it became one of the oldest football clubs in India.

Dukhiram Majumder (1875–1929) became father figure of Aryans during the pre-independence era, regarded as first coach of India who brought up and guided players like Syed Abdus Samad, Gostha Pal, Shibdas Bhaduri and others. Forming a coaching institute within the club, he managed the team throughout his life. It was Majumder, who started Aryan's famous policy of bringing up unknown yet talented footballers. In 1914, the Indian Football Association (IFA) permitted only two native clubs in the CFL Second Division; It Aryan one of them. In that season, Mohun Bagan earned promotion to the Premier Division but Aryan was promoted to the top division two years later. Syed Abdus Samad joined Aryans in 1915. Under Majumdar's coaching, Aryan achieved fourth place in 1920–21 Calcutta Football League and reached the semi-finals of Rovers Cup in 1928. Legendary footballers Balaidas Chatterjee and Karuna Bhattacharya appeared with Aryan at that time.

=== 1930–1960 ===
While Aryan didn't enjoy the same degree of success as Mohun Bagan, they did perform well in patches. The club participated consecutively in the Calcutta Football League with their rivals, and Mohammed Salim (first Indian footballer who played for an overseas club) was one of the legendary players who appeared with Aryan in 1933–34. In the mid-1930s, Dukhiram's nephew Santosh Kumar "Chone" Majumder became head coach of the club. One of Aryan's greatest moments came in 1940, that year, they won IFA Shield defeating Mohun Bagan 4–1, one of India's premier tournaments. They became only the 3rd Indian run club to win the prestigious title. Moreover, they crushed Mohun Bagan 4–1 in the final. In the 40s, Alil Dey and Modassar Yasin Ali Khan from Tangail, became two of the earliest known Bangladeshi footballers to play for the club.

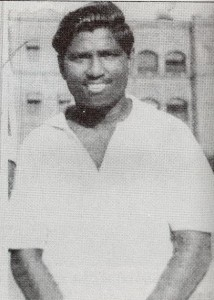
Iconic Indian footballer Sahu Mewalal had two stints with Aryan from 1945 to 1946 and 1956–57.

Aryan enjoyed another spell of success in mid-1950s, reaching the final of IFA Shield in 1955 and 1956 with an ageing Sahu Mewalal in their ranks, who scored multiple hat-tricks for the team. He also emerged as top scorer of CFL in 1949, 1951, 1953, 1954, and 1958. Before or after gaining independence from the British Raj, Aryan participated in every Calcutta Football League editions (until the formation of Premier Division B), which is Asia's oldest football league. During that time, legendary players from Bengal including Sanat Seth have appeared with the club colours.

=== 1960–1980 ===
As the years progressed they gradually lost their status as a top club, instead Aryan became the breeding ground of some of the most famous players in Kolkata maidan. Players like Pradip Kumar Banerjee, Prasun Banerjee, Sanat Seth, Pradyut Barman, Goutam Sarkar, Jahar Das, and Sudhir Karmakar started out in Aryan, before moving on to the bigger clubs. Balai Dey, the only footballer who represented the two nations India and Pakistan in international football, appeared with Aryan in 1967. Other than another IFA Shield win in 1983 (title shared with East Bengal), Aryan didn't achieve a lot of success in modern era.

On the morning of 5 August 1971, the Naxalite intellectual and poet Saroj Dutta was killed by the police in the grounds of the Aryan club on the Calcutta maidan. In 1975, Aryan emerged champion of Sir Churachand Singh Memorial Football Tournament defeating Rajasthan Club.

=== 1990–present ===
In 1998, Aryan reached the final of All Airlines Gold Cup but lost 4–3 to East Bengal in penalty-shootout. They again finished on second position in 2010. In 2019, the club tent in Kolkata Maidan was refurbished.

In June 2023, the Indian Football Association (IFA) announced the merger of both Premier Division A and B of the Calcutta Football League (CFL) ahead of its 125th edition, in which Aryan was included in Group II. In a match of that league season on 19 July, Aryan striker Saikat Sarkar scored a stunning goal from side volley against Calcutta Customs; soon the IFA sent clippings of that goal to the FIFA for Puskás Award.

== Home ground ==
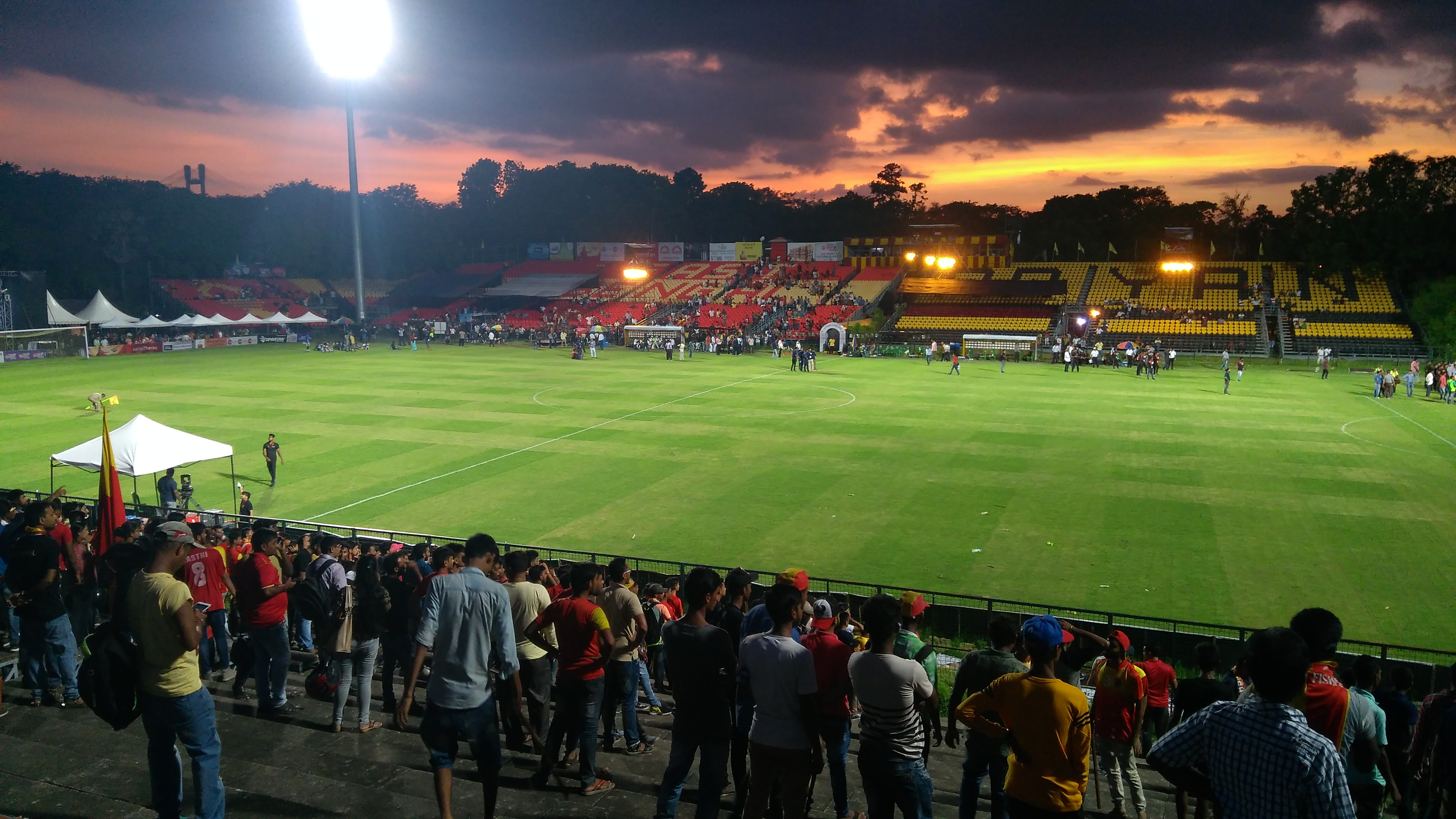
East Bengal Ground on a matchday

Aryan FC plays most of their home matches of Calcutta Premier Division at the East Bengal Ground, which is located in Kolkata Maidan area and has a capacity of 23,500 spectators.

East Bengal Ground layout with the Aryan gallery

The stadium is officially known as East Bengal Ground, having Aryan AC gallery in its northeastern part.

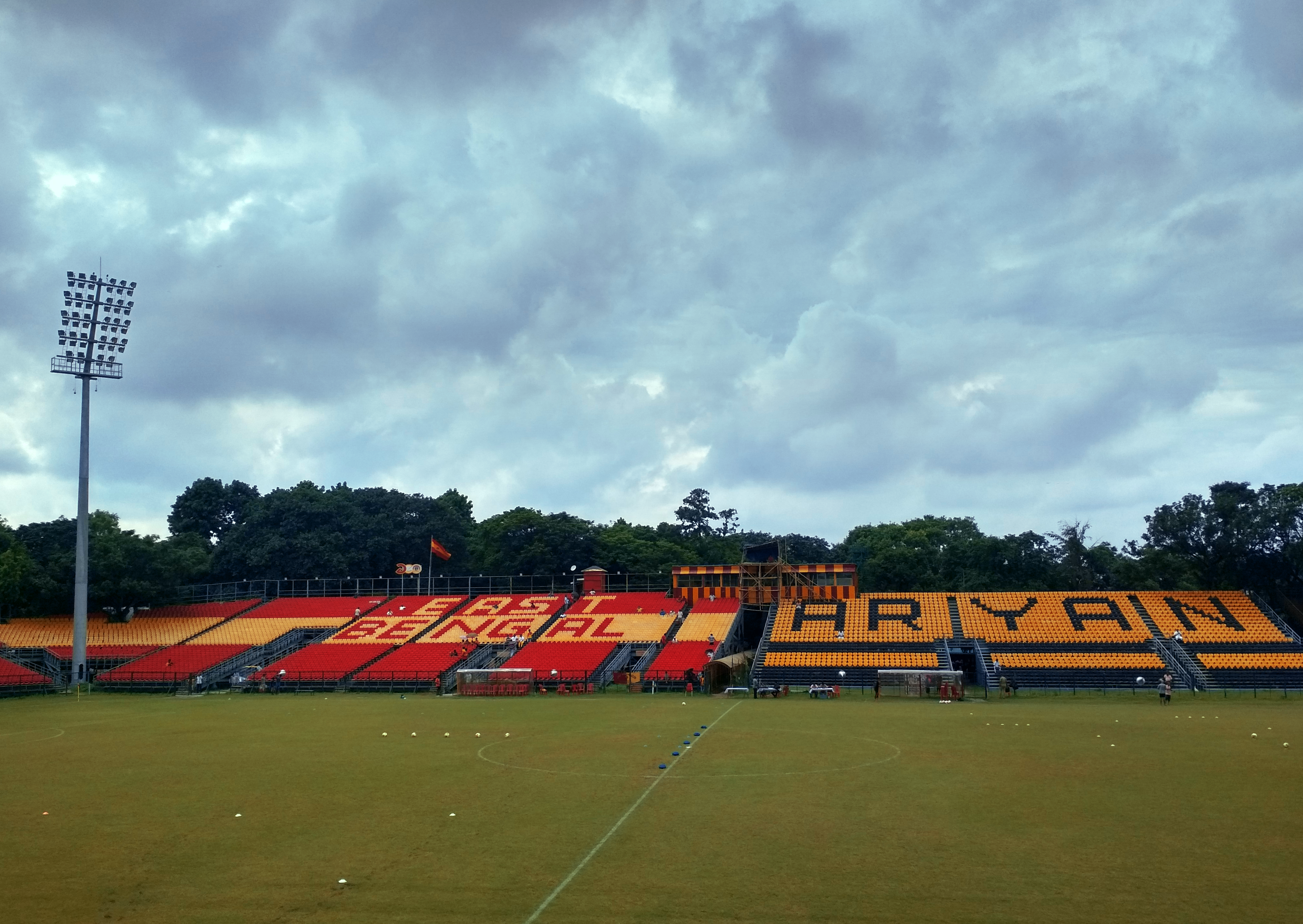
A view of East Bengal Ground with Aryan gallery in right

== Sponsorship ==
The club is currently being sponsored by the Techno India Group, which is a group of engineering and management colleges, public schools. JIS University is the shirt sponsor. The club also acquired service of Trak-Only as their main shirt sponsor.

== Current squad ==
Note: Flags indicate national team as defined under FIFA eligibility rules; some limited exceptions apply. Players may hold more than one non-FIFA nationality.

No.	Pos.	Nation	Player
2	DF	IND	Omeer Hossain
3	DF	IND	Mohan Sarkar
4	DF	IND	Pitambar Das
6	MF	IND	Ankit Mukherjee
8	MF	IND	Raju Koley
9	MF	IND	Firoj Ali
10	MF	IND	Chattu Mondal
11	FW	IND	Rohan Khan
12	MF	IND	Anubrata Maity
13	DF	IND	Manash Sarkar
14	DF	IND	Sukdeb Murmu
16	MF	IND	Hiralal Chettri
17	MF	IND	Rajib Ghorui
18	DF	IND	Suraj Bahadur Gurung

No.	Pos.	Nation	Player
19	MF	IND	Sabir Ali
20	MF	IND	Prasenjit Chakraborty
7	MF	IND	Goutam Thakur
22	DF	IND	Bapan Mondal
25	MF	IND	Asit Hazra
30	MF	IND	Akash Dave
28	MF	IND	Rakesh Karmakar
54	MF	IND	Sandeep Oraon
64	DF	IND	Pravakar Naskar
75	MF	IND	Shamsad Ali
58	MF	LBR	Alfred Jaryan
79	DF	NGR	Kareem Omolaja
10	FW	CMR	Aristide Vaillant

== Notable players ==
The players below, had senior/youth international cap(s) for their respective countries, or, have appeared in domestic league matches representing Aryan FC (years in brackets indicate their spells at the club).

- (British Raj) Syed Abdus Samad (1913)
- (British Raj) Balaidas Chatterjee (1927–1930)
- (British Raj) Karuna Bhattacharya (1928–1930)
- (Pakistan) Osman Jan (1930s)
- (British Raj) Mohammed Salim (1933–34)
- (India) Sahu Mewalal (1945–46; 1956–57)
- (India) Amal Dutta (1950s)
- (India) Sanat Seth (1951–52)
- (India) Pradyut Barman (1951–52)
- (India) Pradip Kumar Banerjee (1955–1967)
- (Pakistan) Tarapada Ray (1956–57)
- (Pakistan) (India) Balai Dey (1967)
- (India) Prasun Banerjee (1970s)
- (India) Gautam Sarkar (1970s)
- (Nigeria) Charles Efemena (2010–2012)
- (Nigeria) Bello Razaq (2018–19)
- (Nigeria) Orok Essien (2018–2019; 2021)
- (Liberia) Alfred Jaryan (2021–2023)

== Managerial history ==
- (India) Dukhiram Majumder (?–1928)
- (India) Santosh "Chone" Majumder (1930s)
- (India) Dasu Mitra (1953–1955)
- (India) Amal Dutta (1960–1962)
- (India) Raghu Nandi (2010–2012)
- (India) Raju Ekka (2014–2017)
- (India) Rajdeep Nandi (2018–present)

== Honours ==
=== League ===
- CFL Second Division
  - Champions (2): 1991, 1996–97

=== Cup ===
- IFA Shield (Note: Fourth oldest football tournament, organized by the IFA (W.B.), and played between the local clubs of West Bengal and other invited ones.)
  - Champions (2): 1940, 1983 (co-winners)
  - Runners-up (2): 1955, 1956
- Trades Cup
  - Champions (1): 1913
- Cooch Behar Cup
  - Champions (5): 1908, 1910, 1932, 1933, 1934
- Bordoloi Trophy
  - Champions (2): 1965, 1966
- All Airlines Gold Cup
  - Runners-up (2): 1998, 2010
- Churachand Singh Trophy
  - Champions (1): 1975
- Lal Bahadur Shastri Cup
  - Champions (1): 1978 (co-winners)
- Rovers Cup
  - Runners-up (1): 1950
- Independence Day Cup (WB)
  - Runners-up (1): 1999
- Manik Upadhayay Memorial Trophy
  - Runners-up (1): 2022
- Naihati Gold Cup
  - Runners-up (1): 2023

== Other departments ==
=== Cricket ===
Men's cricket

The men's cricket section of Aryan is affiliated with the Cricket Association of Bengal (CAB). The club also participates in First Division League, J.C. Mukherjee T-20 Trophy, P. Sen Trophy and other regional tournaments. Noted among players of Aryan, was Bidhu Mukherji, who was part of the India team that toured England in 1911.

Women's cricket

The club operates women's cricket team, that usually takes part in CAB Women's Club T20 League annually. In 2025 season, they achieved runners-up position in the league, losing the final match to Mohammedan Sporting.

=== Men's hockey ===
Aryan formerly had a men's field hockey section, which was affiliated to the Bengal Hockey Association (BHA), and participated in multiple nationwide tournaments including Beighton Cup. The team was once one of the powerful teams from Bengal, with having players from Engineering institution of the Jadavpur University. One of the notable players of the club is Ali Iqtidar Shah Dara, who represented both India and Pakistan at international level and appeared at the 1936 and 1948 Summer Olympics.

=== Academy and youth football ===
In 2019, Aryan's 19 men's team participated in Zee Bangla Football League, a regional franchise-based league that featured teams like Mohun Bagan, East Bengal, and Mohammedan.

== See also ==
- Football in Kolkata
- List of football clubs in West Bengal
- List of football clubs in India
