= Karuna Bhattacharya =

Indian footballer (1909–1979)

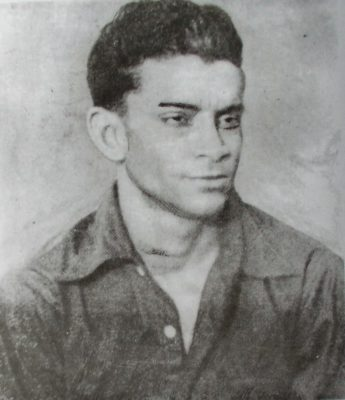

Personal information
- Full name: Karuna Sankar "Habla" Bhattacharya
- Date of birth: 1909
- Date of death: 1979 (aged 69–70)
- Position: Winger

Senior career*
Years	Team	Apps	(Gls)
1928–1930	Aryan		
1930–1938	Mohun Bagan		

International career
1933–1936	India XI		
1938	India	5	(3)

Managerial career
- Mohun Bagan
- * Club domestic league appearances and goals

Karuna Sankar Bhattacharya (1909–1979) was a former Indian footballer who represented and captained the India national football team and Mohun Bagan, a football club in Kolkata. The Karuna Bhattacharya Award is given to the best player of Mohun Bagan in every season. On 29 July 2015 Mohun Bagan conferred the "Mohun Bagan Ratna" to Karuna Bhattacharya. He was the first captain of the India national football team during their first officially recognised match in the international tour of Australia against the Australia national football team in 1938.

== Football career ==
Bhattacharya represented Mohun Bagan for nine consecutive seasons from 1930 onwards. He played alongside Gostha Pal, Syed Abdus Samad, Umapati Kumar, Balaidas Chatterjee, Sanmatha Dutta, Bimal Mukherjee, R. Lumsden, Satu Chowdhury, and many others during that time. The period from 1933 to 1939 was a golden era for Mohun Bagan, and they won 29 trophies during this time. In these 7 years, Mohun Bagan was virtually invincible in derby losing only 1 match that period to an East Bengal. From 1938 onwards, he did play few years in Customs.

After brushing up his skills under the coaching of Dukhiram Majumder, Bhattacharya started his career in Aryan before joining Mohun Bagan in 1930. He was scouted by Dukhiram Majumder in Berhampur, and was signed by Aryan in 1928. Bhattacharya debuted for the club in Rovers Cup.

He joined Mohun Bagan in 1930. With the club, he scored several important goals in his football career while playing as the right-in in the 2–3–5 formation. He was one of the most vital players in the team when Mohun Bagan won their first ever league title, winning the Calcutta Football League in 1939. He also played few exhibition matches in Bangladesh with IFA XI in 1930.

In July 1938, Bhattacharya went on to play an international charity match against an 'all European team' in Calcutta, where they were defeated by a solitary goal. He was the captain of the Indian team, managed by Pankaj Gupta, that went to Australia in 1938 after the invitation from Australian Football Association. He was one of the stars during the Australia tour, scoring a brace against Queensland and the Australia National Team. He was also part of the Indian team that played against the Olympic team of China in 1936. The match ended in a 1–1 draw.

Bhattacharya also was part of several Indians vs. Europeans football matches from 1931 to 1939. During this period, he played against the Europeans in 1932 (5–0), 1933 (2–0), 1935 (5–0), 1937 (1–0), 1938 (0–1), and 1939 (2–2). In this series which was held once a year, Karuna Bhattacharya scored in 1932 (2 goals), 1935 (2 goals), 1939 (1 goal). He also was part of the IFA XI side that went to Ceylon and South Africa tour in 1933 and 1934 respectively. IFA XI won 4 matches in Ceylon (3–2, 4–1, 1–0, 2–0) while the other match ended in a 1–1 draw. Out of the 19 games played in South Africa, IFA XI won 18 (6–0, 6–1, 6–1, 2–0, 2–0, 7–1, 9–0, 6–1, 3–1, 4–1, 6–1, 8–1, 1–0, 2–1, 4–1, 2–0, 2–0, 5–0) and lost just 1 match (1–3). Under the captaincy of Bhattacharya, the Indian team played 15 games, out of which they won 6 (6–1, 5–2, 5–2, 4–1, 6–4, 3–1), drew 2 (4–4, 3–3) and lost 7 matches (2–4, 4–6, 1–2, 3–5, 4–5, 4–6, 1–5).

== Post-playing career ==
After retiring from football, he became the football secretary of Mohun Bagan in 1955 and 1961, and also worked as the tennis secretary in 1954. He later became manager of the "green and maroon brigade" in several tournaments including their tour of Indonesia in 1956, tour of East Africa in 1961, and tour of Sri Lanka in 1968. As manager of Mohun Bagan, Bhattacharya along with club officials Sailen Manna and Chuni Goswami went with team to newly independent Bangladesh in May 1972, where they defeated Dhaka Mohammedan in first match but lost the second match to Shadhin Bangla football team.

== International statistics ==
Scores and results list India's goal tally first.

Goal	Date	Venue	Opponent	Result	Competition
1	3 September 1938	Royal Agricultural Show Ground, Sydney, Australia	Australia	3–5	Friendly
2	10 September 1938	Royal Brisbane Exhibition Ground, Brisbane, Australia	Australia	4–4	Friendly
3	17 September 1938	Newcastle Sports Ground, Newcastle, Australia	Australia	4–1	Friendly

== Honours ==
Mohun Bagan

- Coochbehar Cup: 1931, 1935, 1936
- Lakhsmibilas Cup: 1937
- Trades Cup: 1938

Individual

- Mohun Bagan Ratna: 2015

== Legacy ==
Mohun Bagan Athletic Club began giving the "Karuna Sankar Bhattacharya Memorial Award for best footballer" in memory of him.

== See also ==
- Football in Kolkata
- History of Indian football
- History of the India national football team
- List of India national football team captains

== Bibliography ==
- Kapadia, Novy (2017). Barefoot to Boots: The Many Lives of Indian Football. Penguin Random House. ISBN 978-0-143-42641-7.
- Sen, Dwaipayan (2013). "Wiping the Stain Off the Field of Plassey: Mohun Bagan in 1911". In Bandyopadhyay, Kausik; Mallick, Sabyasachi (eds.). Fringe Nations in World Soccer. Routledge. ISBN 978-1-317-99810-5.
- Sen, Ronojoy (2015). "The Empire Strikes Back: The 1911 IFA Shield and Football in Calcutta". Nation at Play: A History of Sport in India. Columbia University Press. ISBN 978-0-231-16490-0.
- Mitra, Soumen (1 January 2006). In Search of an Identity: The History of Football in Colonial Calcutta. Kolkata: Dasgupta & Co. Private Ltd. ISBN 978-8182110229. Archived from the original on 21 October 2022.
- Martinez, Dolores; Mukharjiim, Projit B (2009). Football: From England to the World: The Many Lives of Indian Football. Routledge. ISBN 978-1-138-88353-6. Archived from the original on 2 July 2022.
- Nath, Nirmal (2011). History of Indian Football: Upto 2009–10. Readers Service. ISBN 9788187891963. Archived from the original on 22 July 2022.
- Majumdar, Boria; Bandyopadhyay, Kausik (2006). A Social History Of Indian Football: Striving To Score. Routledge. ISBN 9780415348355. Archived from the original on 29 June 2021.
- Bolsmann, Chris; Vahed, Goolam (2 November 2017). "'They Are Fine Specimens of the Illustrious Indian Settler': Sporting Contact between India and South Africa, 1914–1955". Journal of Southern African Studies. 43 (6): 1273–1291. doi:10.1080/03057070.2017.1379689. ISSN 0305-7070. S2CID 148862123. Archived from the original on 3 October 2022.
- Mukhopadhay, Subir (2018). সোনায় লেখা ইতিহাসে মোহনবাগান (transl. Mohun Bagan in the history written in gold). ISBN 978-93-850172-0-9.
- Banerjee, Argha; Basu, Rupak (2022). মোহনবাগান: সবুজ ঘাসের মেরুন গল্প (transl. Mohun Bagan: Green fields' Maroon stories). Shalidhan. ISBN 978-81-954667-0-2.
- Basu, Jaydeep (2003). Stories from Indian Football. UBS Publishers' Distributors. ISBN 9788174764546. Archived from the original on 11 October 2022.
