= Balaidas Chatterjee =

Indian footballer and coach (1900–1974)

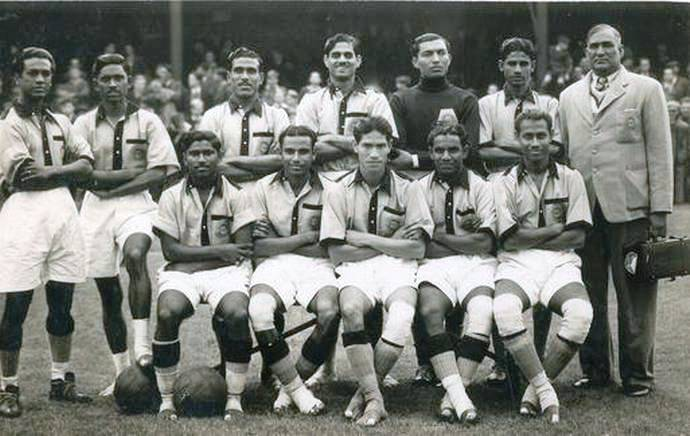
- Balaidas Chatterjee (in extreme right) with the Indian team at the 1948 London Olympics

Personal information
- Date of birth: 10 March 1900
- Date of death: 1974
- Position: Defender

Senior career*
Years	Team	Apps	(Gls)
1921–1927	Mohun Bagan		
1927–1930	Aryan Club		

Managerial career
- ?–1948: Mohun Bagan
- 1948: India
- 1949–1959: Bengal
- 1953–1954: India
- 1960s: Mohun Bagan (team manager)
- * Club domestic league appearances and goals

Balaidas Chatterjee (Bengali: বলাইদাস চ্যাটার্জি; 10 March 1900 – 1974) was an Indian footballer and football manager, who played predominantly as defender. He became the first head coach of the India national team and guided them at the 1948 Summer Olympics in London. During his playing days, Chatterjee played for Mohun Bagan in various domestic competitions.

On 29 July 2013, it was announced that Chatterjee would receive the Mohun Bagan Ratna posthumously for his achievements while at the club.

== Playing career ==
Chatterjee was brought up and coached by legendary Dukhiram Majumder, founder of Aryans. He joined then Calcutta Football League side Mohun Bagan in 1921 and was part of the "golden era" of the club during British rule in India. Being a multi-sports personality, he was a tough guy on field, known for giving a "fitting reply" to the Europeans during matches. In 1923, they participated at the Rovers Cup in Bombay and defeated several English teams to reach the final, the first Indian team to do so, but went down 4–1 to a technically superior team 2nd Battalion of Durham Light Infantry. They later defeated Calcutta' FC (the oldest football club in India with having Europeans in squad) for the first time in the return leg of Calcutta Football League. In 1925, his team became the first civilian Indian team to be invited in the historic Durand Cup, where they were defeated by Sherwood Foresters in semi-finals.

Chatterjee played for the club successfully as center half in 2–3–5 formation throughout his career. In the 1930s, He represented Mohun Bagan in multiple tournaments alongside some of club's legendary players — Karuna Bhattacharya, Syed Abdus Samad, Umapati Kumar, Sanmatha Dutta, Bimal Mukherjee, and Satu Chowdhury. After leaving Mohun Bagan, he appeared with Aryan, one of the oldest clubs in the city.

== As referee ==
After retirement, he went on to become match referee and officiated numerous football matches between Indian and visiting European teams.

== Managerial career ==
=== Mohun Bagan ===
Chatterjee began his managerial career as trainer cum head coach in his former club Mohun Bagan and guided the team in Calcutta Football League until joining the Indian team in 1948. He later served as secretary of the club. Under his leadership, youth department of Mohun Bagan was set up in 1944. During his tenure, Sheoo Mewalal signed with and played for "the mariners".

=== India: 1948 Summer Olympics ===
After gaining independence from Great Britain in 1947, India sent a football team to the 1948 Summer Olympics in London, England. Chatterjee became head coach of India and he had prepared the team that defeated Department Store XI 15–0 on 13 July, and Metropolitan Police F.C. 3–1 on 16 July. As part of preparation, they toured to Europe and went on to defeat English teams, Pinner F.C. 9–1 on 24 July, Hayes F.C. 4–1 on 26 July, and Alexandra Park FC 8–2 on 28 July.

In the main tournament, their first match was against Burma, but the game was a walkover. India played their one and only match of the tournament against France, in which Chatterjee was the head coach of the Indian side. India lost the match 2–1 through goals from René Courbin and René Persillon, with the Indian goal coming from Sarangapani Raman. His team was having some legendary footballers of the country, captain Talimeren Ao, Sailen Manna, Sheoo Mewalal, Mahabir Prasad, and Ahmed Khan. After the tournament, Indian footballers' bravery and brilliance in bare feet, earned them admiration of Princess Margaret, younger sister of Queen Elizabeth II.

India later went on to play few friendly matches in their Nederlands tour, where they went down to Sparta Rotterdam, but managed to win 5–1 against Ajax Amsterdam.

=== India: 1953–54 ===
Chatterjee again took charge of India in 1953 and managed the team in Asian Quadrangular Football Tournament in Rangoon. India won title as few new faces like Amal Dutta, Anthony Patrick, and Chandan Singh Rawat. got the opportunity to play.

=== Mohun Bagan ===
He was associated with Mohun Bagan in the 1950s and 60s, and mentored some of India's notable footballers, predominantly Chuni Goswami, and Kajal Mukherjee. When Arun Sinha became coach, Chatterjee became team manager of the club. In the 1960s, the club won Calcutta Football League, IFA Shield and Durand Cup multiple times. He was in the team management of Mohun Bagan, and was part of Jarnail Singh led team that toured to East Africa and played matches in Uganda, Kenya, Zanzibar and Tanganyika.

=== Bengal: Santosh Trophy ===
Chatterjee became coach of Bengal football team in 1949. He trained players for the Santosh Trophy, one of the prestigious tournaments in the country. With Bengal, he won six Santosh Trophies between 1949 and 1959, and groomed players like Sailen Manna, Sheoo Mewalal, P. K. Banerjee.

== Honours ==
=== Player ===
Mohun Bagan

- Rovers Cup runner-up: 1923
- IFA Shield runner-up: 1923

=== Manager ===
India

- Asian Quadrangular Football Tournament: 1953

Bengal

- Santosh Trophy: 1949–50, 1950-51, 1951–52, 1953-54, 1955–56, 1958-59, 1959-60

Individual

- Mohun Bagan Ratna: 2013

== See also ==
- Football in Kolkata
- History of Indian football
- History of the India national football team
- India national football team at the Olympics
- List of India national football team managers
