= Dukhiram =

Dukhiram is an Indian Odia masculine given name. Notable people with the name include:

- Dukhiram Majumder (1875–1929), Indian football coach and manager
- Dukhiram Swain (born 1995), Indian actor
