= Dukhiram Majumder =

Indian football coach and manager (1875–1929)

Personal information
- Full name: Dukhiram Majumder
- Date of birth: 1875
- Place of birth: Calcutta, Bengal Presidency, British India
- Date of death: 16 June 1929 (aged 53–54)
- Place of death: Calcutta, Bengal Presidency, British India
- Position: Centre-back

Senior career*
Years	Team	Apps	(Gls)
- Wellington Club

Managerial career
- Students Union
- ?–1928: Aryan Club
- * Club domestic league appearances and goals

Dukhiram Majumder (born Oomesh Chandra Majumder (Bengali: উমেশচন্দ্র মজুমদার); also Mazumdar; 1875 – 16 June 1929) was an Indian footballer, football manager, scout and club official, who is regarded as the first football coach in the country. He first understood the importance of Indian players wearing boots. During his coaching days, Majumder managed Calcutta Football League side Aryans Club, alongside nurturing talents like Gostha Pal, Shibdas Bhaduri, Syed Abdus Samad, Karuna Bhattacharya, and Balaidas Chatterjee.

== Early life and playing career ==
Dukhiram Majumder was born in a Bengali middle class family in Bosepara, Bagbazar, North Calcutta, in 1875. During the age of associations in Bengal, he became involved in football organizations and started playing.

A well-known centre-half during his time, he played barefoot against British army teams. He later went on to play for Wellington Club, which was formed as merger of three native clubs: Boys Club, Friends Club, and Presidency Club — all founded by Nagendra Prasad Sarbadhikari.

== Foundation of Aryan ==
Majumder was one of the pupils (other being Kalicharan Mitra, Manmatha Ganguly and Haridas Seal) in the 1880s, who took football as part of life following Nagendra Prasad Sarbadhikari, the "father of Indian football". As a youth, he formed Luner Club in Shyampukur. Majumder later founded a sporting organization named "Students Union" with his friends within Kirti Mitter's (also Mitra) marble palace named Mohun Bagan Villa. That organization broke up due to disagreements over wearing boots and Majumder left Mohun Bagan Villa and went on to form Aryans Club in Maharaja Durga Charan Laha's Telipara field in Shyampukur. Some of those who were against Majumder's Students Union, also left Mohun Bagan Villa and established Bagbazar Club. Those who were outside these two sides, continued to play without boots until the foundation of Mohun Bagan Athletic Club by Bengali aristocratic families of North Calcutta presided over by Bhupendra Nath Bose.

Aryans Club, now known as Aryan FC, began its journey as a multi-sports club in 1884, became one of the oldest football clubs in the country. They soon gained elite status and fought against British teams consecutively.

== Coaching career ==
=== Scouting and coaching ===
What I have heard about him is a fairy tale. When I hear the name of Sir Dukhiram, I think that Sir Dukhiram is standing with a football in his hand, with a hat on his head, wearing a jersey, and a dhoti. Students sitting in front of him on the field are listening attentively.

— Former Indian international and coach P. K. Banerjee on Dukhiram Majumder.

Majumdar was the father figure of Indian football during the pre-independence era. He made huge impact in the history of the sport in the country by bringing up India's earliest known legends. Among his students, India national football team's first captain Gostha Pal is the iconic name. Known for scouting players from various parts of Bengal, he gave formal training to "football jadukar" Syed Abdus Samad from Purnia, two brothers Shibdas and Bijoydas Bhaduri from Shyambazar, Surya Chakraborty from Jalpaiguri, Habla Bhattacharya (Karuna Bhattacharya) from Behrampore. He emphasized the physical toughness of players and team cohesion. Majumder guided and had taken care of his players in every way. To protect Samad from the fierce communal situation of the time, he arranged for him to stay in a Hindu family, naming him 'Santosh'. He also used to cycle daily a distance of about 15 kilometers to deliver purified drinking water to the home of a tuberculosis-affected player. Mohun Bagan was one of the clubs that kept an eye on his scouting. Some forgotten gems of Indian football, goalkeeper Purnadas, Haran Saha, Fakir Seal, Kshirprasad, all were scouted and trained by Majumder.

Majumder wrote a book named Hints to the Young Footballer, published in 1916, to properly guide and make the Indian youth enthusiastic about the sport. He is also known for coaching some of India's best cricket talents during his time, including the "grand old man of Indian cricket" Kamal Bhattacharya.

=== In charge of Aryan ===
Majumder became team coach of Aryan in the late 1890s. With limited resources and facilities, the club became prominent in fighting against then European sides Dalhousie, Calcutta FC and other British regimental teams. He started Aryan's famous policy of bringing up unknown talented footballers, who subsequently established themselves in Calcutta maidan. When the Indian Football Association (IFA) permitted only two native clubs to join CFL Second Division in 1914, Majumder guided Aryan in the season, and they were promoted to the top division two years later. He helped the team achieving fourth place in 1920–21 season of Calcutta Football League. Aryan with players like Balaidas Chatterjee, later broke into the semi-finals of historic Rovers Cup in 1928.

He formed a coaching centre within the club which became the foremost pillar of Aryan. After the death of Majumder in 1929, the club followed the path shown by him, and his nephew Chone Majumder (who also became Aryan coach) succeeded him to run the centre. The club later in 1940, went on to clinch IFA Shield title defeating Mohun Bagan 4–1, their first major title.

== Legacy ==
After the death of Majumder, his nephew Santosh Kumar "Chone" Majumder took over the responsibility of coaching in Aryans Club. The 'Majumdar Trophy', named after him, was once awarded to the winning district in the inter-district football competition in West Bengal.

A statue of Majumder was unveiled at the club tent of Aryan in Kolkata. Notable coach Achyut Banerjee began the "Dukhiram Football Coaching Scheme" in memory of him, which was incorporated in 1976 at the Mohun Bagan Ground before shifting to Aryan.

== See also ==
- Football in Kolkata
- History of Indian football – Overview of the history of association football in India

== Bibliography ==
- Chattopadhyay, Hariprasad (3 April 2019). স্যার দুখীরাম (transl. Sir Dukhiram). Sutradhar Prakashani. Kolkata.
- Majumdar, Boria; Mangan, J. A. (13 September 2013). Sport in South Asian Society: Past and Present. Oxford: Routledge. p. 117. ISBN 978-1-317-99894-5. Archived from the original on 3 November 2023.
- Mitra, Soumen (1 January 2006). In Search of an Identity: The History of Football in Colonial Calcutta. Kolkata: Dasgupta & Co. Private Ltd. ISBN 978-8182110229. Archived from the original on 21 October 2022.
- Kapadia, Novy (2017). Barefoot to Boots: The Many Lives of Indian Football. Penguin Random House. ISBN 978-0-143-42641-7.
- Sen, Dwaipayan (2013). "Wiping the Stain Off the Field of Plassey: Mohun Bagan in 1911". In Bandyopadhyay, Kausik; Mallick, Sabyasachi (eds.). Fringe Nations in World Soccer. Routledge. ISBN 978-1-317-99810-5.
- Sen, Ronojoy (2015). "The Empire Strikes Back: The 1911 IFA Shield and Football in Calcutta". Nation at Play: A History of Sport in India. Columbia University Press. ISBN 978-0-231-16490-0.
- Martinez, Dolores; Mukharji, Projit B (2009). Football: From England to the World: The Many Lives of Indian Football. Routledge. ISBN 978-1-138-88353-6. Archived from the original on 2 July 2022.
- Sharma, Nikhil Paramjit; Gupta, Shantanu (4 February 2019). India's Football Dream. SAGE Publications India. ISBN 9789353283063. Archived from the original on 4 October 2022.
- Dutta, P. L., Memoir of 'Father of Indian Football' Nagendraprasad Sarbadhikary (Calcutta: N. P. Sarbadhikary Memorial Committee, 1944) (hereafter Memoir)
- Majumdar, Boria; Bandyopadhyay, Kausik (2006). Goalless: The Story of a Unique Footballing Nation. Penguin India. ISBN 9780670058747.
- Ghosh, Saurindra Kumar. Krira Samrat Nagendraprasad Sarbadhikary 1869–1940 (Calcutta: N. P. Sarbadhikary Memorial Committee, 1963) (hereafter Krira Samrat).
- Nath, Nirmal (2011). History of Indian Football: Upto 2009–10. Readers Service. ISBN 9788187891963. Archived from the original on 22 July 2022.
- Dineo, Paul; Mills, James (2001). Soccer in South Asia: Empire, Nation, Diaspora. London, United Kingdom: Frank Cass Publishers. ISBN 978-0-7146-8170-2. Archived from the original on 25 July 2022.
- D'Mello, Anthony (1959). Portrait Of Indian Sport. P R Macmillan Limited, London.
- Mukhopadhay, Subir (2018). সোনায় লেখা ইতিহাসে মোহনবাগান (transl. Mohun Bagan in the history written in gold). ISBN 978-93-850172-0-9.
- Banerjee, Argha; Basu, Rupak (2022). মোহনবাগান: সবুজ ঘাসের মেরুন গল্প (transl. Mohun Bagan: Green fields' Maroon stories). Shalidhan. ISBN 978-81-954667-0-2.
- Majumdar, Boria; Bandyopadhyay, Kausik (2006). A Social History Of Indian Football: Striving To Score. Routledge. ISBN 9780415348355. Archived from the original on 29 June 2021.
- Basu, Jaydeep (2003). Stories from Indian Football. UBS Publishers' Distributors. ISBN 9788174764546. Archived from the original on 11 October 2022.
- Shreekumar, S. S. (15 August 2020). THE BEST WAY FORWARD FOR INDIA'S FOOTBALL. HSRA Publications. p. 244. ISBN 9788194721697. Archived from the original on 4 February 2023.
- Bandyopadhyay, Kausik (2008). "Football in Bengali culture and society: a study in the social history of football in Bengal 1911–1980". Shodhganga. University of Calcutta. p. 35. hdl:10603/174532. Archived from the original on 7 October 2022.
