= Kolkata Police Friendship Cup =

Indian football tournament

Kolkata Police Friendship Cup is a football tournament organised by the Kolkata Police every year for the local clubs of Kolkata. Over 500 clubs have participated in the tournament.

It started as an initiative of the Chief Minister of West Bengal Buddhadeb Bhattacharya, aimed at improving the public-police interface through football sentiments of the city. The slogan is Para football at its best.
