= List of people from Vidyasagar College Kolkata =

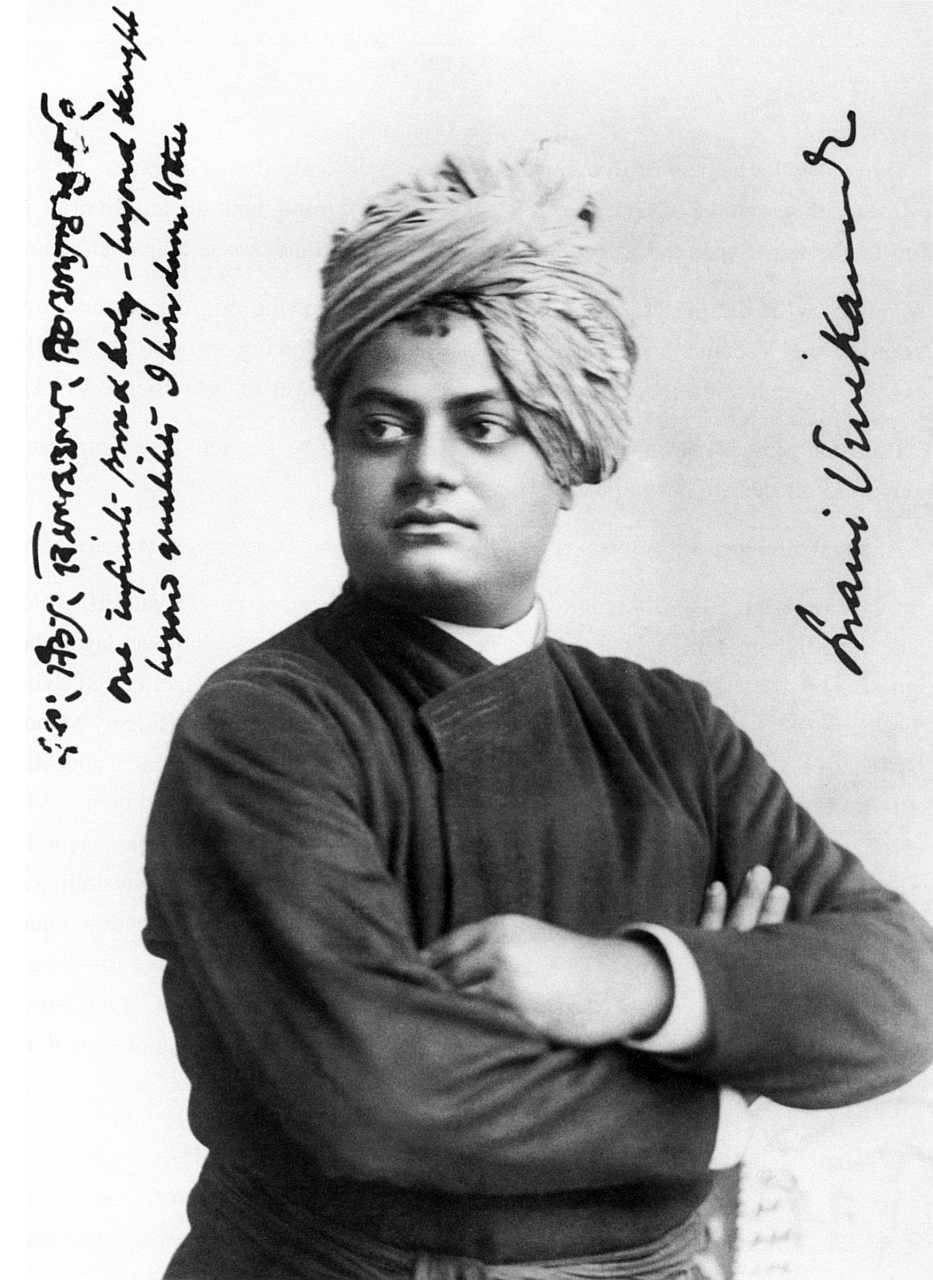
Swami Vivekananda, the most notable alumnus, attended the former Metropolitan Institution

Vidyasagar College has produced a large number of notable individuals who have made significant contributions to society since its foundation. The institution was previously a school known as the Metropolitan Institution before being upgraded to a college in 1871. In 1917, it was renamed Vidyasagar College.

== Notable alumni before upgradation to college (before 1871) ==
Name	Notability	Ref.
Swami Vivekananda	Philosopher and Hindu monk	
Bhaktisiddhanta Sarasvati	Philosopher and Hindu monk	
Brahmabandhav Upadhyay	Theologian, journalist and Indian freedom fighter	
Charu Chandra Bhattacharya	Bengali writer of scientific literature for children	
Priyanath Bose	Circus performer and entrepreneur	

== Notable alumni after upgradation to college (after 1871) ==
=== Freedom fighters, activists and revolutionaries ===
Name	Notability	Ref.
Abinash Chandra Bhattacharya	Noted for his role in the Indo-German Conspiracy during World War I	
Barada Bhushan Chakraborty	Communist peasant leader and prominent face of the Tebhaga movement	
Birendranath Sasmal	Freedom fighter, barrister and politician; popularly known as "Deshapran" and "The uncrowned King of Midnapore"	
Chintamani Panigrahi	Freedom fighter who participated in the Indian Independence Movement	
Ganesh Man Singh	Nepalese freedom fighter known as the "Father of Democracy" in Nepal	
Ram Manohar Lohia	Activist in the Quit India Movement and Indian Independence Movement	

=== Literature ===
Name	Notability	Ref.
Upendrakishore Ray Chowdhury	Bengali writer, publisher and entrepreneur	
Sharadindu Bandyopadhyay	Bengali novelist and creator of Byomkesh Bakshi	
Ananda Chandra Agarwala	Assamese writer and poet	
Durga Mohan Bhattacharyya	Sanskrit scholar	
Sarat Chandra Goswami	Assamese writer and founder member of Asam Sahitya Sabha	
Himanish Goswami	Writer, journalist and cartoonist	
Ajit Dutta	Bengali poet and author	
Dhirendralal Dhar	National Award-winning children's author	

=== Scholars, scientists and academics ===
Name	Notability	Ref.
Ajoy Home	Aviculturist, ornithologist and naturalist	
Durga Mohan Bhattacharyya	Sanskrit scholar	
Jagat Jiban Ghosh	Researcher in biological sciences, biochemistry and neurobiochemistry	
Prafulla Chandra Ray	Chemist; regarded as the father of chemical science in India	
Radheshyam Brahmachari	Scholar	
Sarada Charan Das	Scientist	
Saratchandra Mitra	Scientist and founding head of the Department of Anthropology, University of Calcutta	
Satya Churn Law	Ornithologist	

=== Cinema and theatre ===
Name	Notability	Ref.
Chhabi Biswas	Bengali actor and theatre artist	
Debaki Bose	Film director and recipient of the Padma Shri	
Himangshu Dutta	Music director	
Madhu Bose	Film director, actor, singer and screenwriter	
Paoli Dam	Actress	
Subhra Sourav Das	Actor associated with Swapnasandhani	
Tarachand Barjatya	Founder of Rajshri Productions	

=== Singers and musicians ===
Name	Notability	Ref.
Manna Dey	Playback singer	
Ruprekha Banerjee	Singer specialising in Rabindrasangeet and Hindustani classical music	
Sailajaranjan Majumdar	Rabindra Sangeet singer and teacher	
Silajit Majumder	Singer and composer	
Vishmadev Chattopadhyay	Indian classical vocalist of the Delhi Gharana	

=== Politicians ===
Name	Notability	Ref.
Ashim Kumar Ghosh	19th Governor of Haryana	
Basanta Kumar Das	Federal minister of Pakistan	
Chintamani Panigrahi	Former Governor of Manipur	
Ganesh Man Singh	Leader of Nepal's democratic movement	
Jyotipriya Mallick	MLA and former Cabinet Minister, Government of West Bengal	
Ram Manohar Lohia	Founder of the Congress Socialist Party	
Ram Sunder Das	Former Chief Minister of Bihar	
Sadhan Pande	Former Minister for Consumer Affairs, West Bengal	
Tarit Baran Topdar	Former Member of Parliament	
Shyamaprasanna Bhattacharyya	Former Member of Legislative Assembly	

=== Sports ===
Name	Notability	Ref.
Gostha Pal	Indian footballer	
Asim Mukhopadhyay	Mountaineer	
Brojen Das	First Asian to swim across the English Channel	
Dipankar Ghosh	Mountaineer	
Pankaj Roy	Indian cricketer	
Priyanath Bose	Circus performer and pioneer of circus in India	

=== Other personalities ===
Name	Notability	Ref.
Prabhat Ranjan Sarkar	Philosopher, religious leader and founder of Ananda Marga	
Mitter Bedi	Industrial photographer	
Jitendra Nath Ghosh	Chairman of Netaji Research Bureau	

== Notable faculty ==
Name	Notability	Ref.
Kshirode Prasad Vidyavinode	Poet, novelist, dramatist and nationalist	
Surendranath Banerjee	Nationalist leader, educator and politician	
