= Gostha Pal =

Indian footballer (1896–1976)

Gostha Paul
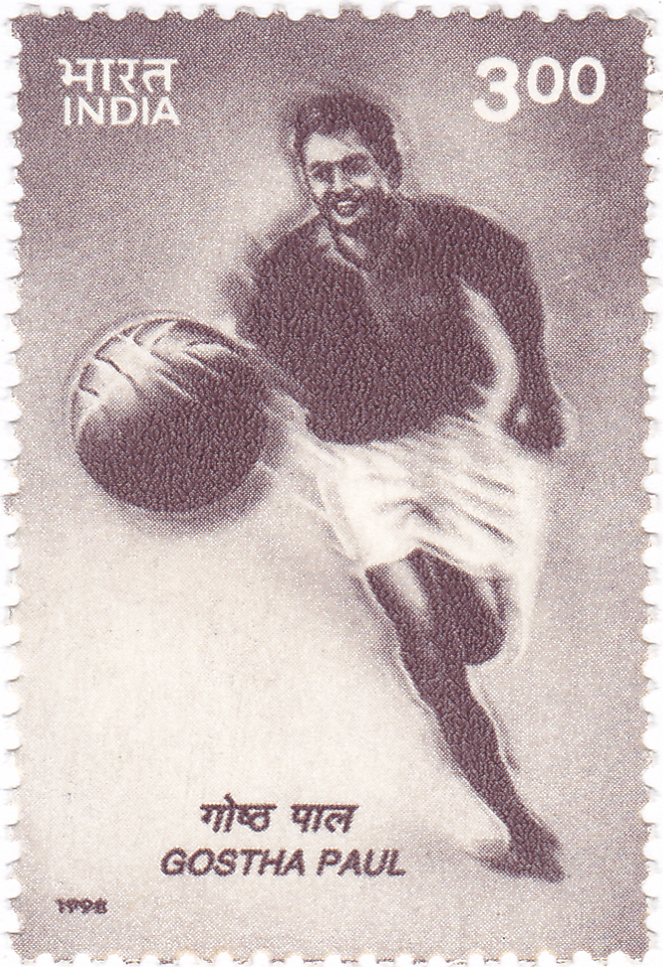
- Paul on a 1998 stamp of India

Personal information
- Full name: Gostha Behari Paul
- Date of birth: 20 August 1896
- Place of birth: Bhojeswar, Bengal Presidency, British India (present-day Bangladesh)
- Date of death: 8 April 1976 (aged 79)
- Place of death: Kolkata, West Bengal, India
- Position: Centre-back

Senior career*
Years	Team	Apps	(Gls)
1907–1912	Kumartuli AC	11	(0)
1912–1936	Mohun Bagan	617	(43)

International career
1924–1935	India	37	(5)
- * Club domestic league appearances and goals

Gostha Behari Paul (20 August 1896 – 8 April 1976) was an Indian footballer who played primarily as a defender. Nicknamed "the Chinese wall", Paul was the captain of the India national team, who played during the 1920s and 30s.

Spending most of his career in Mohun Bagan, Paul was a defender and a well-known player, along with Balaidas Chaterjee, who played for the century-old club.

== Early and personal life ==
Born on 20 August 1896 in Bhojeswar, Faridpore, Bengal Presidency (now in Bangladesh), Pal was son of Baboo Shyamlal Pal, a businessman. He moved to Calcutta when he was an infant and lived there till his final days. Pal was a student of Sarada Charan Aryan Institution in Beniatola.

Even if you did not find it necessary to inform us about your marriage, it is my responsibility to bless you on behalf of the Club. After we won the 1911 IFA Shield, I got 12 of these badges made. I gave 11 to the 11 players and still have the 12th one with me. I had thought I will give it to someone who will carry forward the tradition and heritage of Mohun Bagan, someone who will always be with the Club.

— Major Sailen Bose, then secretary of Mohun Bagan, after giving the Mohun Bagan badge to Pal after his marriage.

Since his childhood, he used to play both football and cricket, alongside hockey and tennis. He later represented Mohun Bagan cricket team many times. Pal was married to Pushpa Kundu and gave birth their sons Nirangshu and Sukumar. He was influenced by legendary footballer Shibdas Bhaduri and choose football later, after watching Mohun Bagan's historic IFA Shield victory in 1911 from gallery.

Pal went to Vidyasagar College in Calcutta and came close to then principal Saradaranjan Ray, who is regarded as father of cricket in Bengal. He was given the title "Chowdhury" during British Raj, but never used it due to nationalist sentiments. Pal went on to write his autobiography which is unfinished and unpublished.

== Club career ==
Sir Dukhiram Majumder was the father figure of football in India during the pre-independence era, credited for bringing up players like Pal, Shibdas Bhaduri and others. He was also groomed and coached by Rajen Sen and Major Sailen Bose.

"I see, you are Goshto Pal, the Chinese Wall."

— Rabindranath Tagore, Asia's first Nobel laureate, addressed Pal after meeting him, after arrival of Mohun Bagan players in Santiniketan.

Nicknamed as "Chiner Pracheer" (The Great Wall of China), Pal was one of the best defenders of contemporary Indian football. He started playing for Kumartuli Athletic Club at the age of 11, and was spotted there by Kalicharan Mitra, also known as Kali Mittir, one of only two Indian members in the governing body of the Indian Football Association (IFA) at the time. Mittir was influential and well-connected in the Indian football scene, and the first to identify Pal's unique defence techniques. He was signed by Mohun Bagan at the age of 16, as a replacement for Reverend Sudhir Chatterjee. After joining the team, he played in the 1914 Calcutta Football League second division; Mohun Bagan for the first time played in the tournament and finished third with only the top non-military team be promoted to CFL 1st Division. They played their first match of the first division on 15 May 1915 against Calcutta Cricket and Football Club, which was drawn. In 1916, he appeared in Asanullah Cup in Decca, in which they went down to Sovabazar Club in final.

Gostha Imapegnable as the Chinese Wall

— The proverb on Gostha Pal, was written by a British journalist under the pseudonym "Red Rose" in The Englishman.

Playing barefooted, Pal faced problems in his early games but regained his composure quickly to mark his monopoly in the defence, and is unanimously praised for his contributions in defence in the match against British team Black Watch. In 1921, Gostho Paul was honoured with the captaincy of the Mohun Bagan football team, and he remained as the club captain for next 5 years. He gained legendary status in 1923 when Mohun Bagan participated at the Rovers Cup in Bombay and defeated several English teams to reach the final, the first Indian team to do so – but lost 4–1 to a technically superior team 2nd Battalion of Durham Light Infantry. In the same year, they defeated Calcutta Cricket and Football Club, the oldest football club in the country with having Europeans in squad, for the first time in the return leg of CFL. In 1925, Mohun Bagan became the first civilian Indian team to be invited to the oldest football tournament in Asia, Durand Cup, where they lost to Sherwood Foresters in the semi-finals.

On 28 May 1925, he captained Mohun Bagan at the first official match of Kolkata Derby against East Bengal in the Calcutta Football League, in their 1–0 defeat. In the 1930s, Pal played for Mohun Bagan alongside some of club's legendary players including Karuna Bhattacharya, Syed Abdus Samad, Umapati Kumar, Balaidas Chatterjee, Sanmatha Dutta, Bimal Mukherjee, and Satu Chowdhury. Beside playing for Mohun Bagan, Pal was invited to join newly formed East Bengal Club by its founder president Suresh Chandra Chaudhari in 1920; he joined the team and appeared as captain in Hercules Cup, a 'seven-a-side' competition, and they managed to win title.

During a league match between Mohun Bagan and Calcutta FC in 1935, Pal protested against the biased refereeing, that angered then British-dominated Indian Football Association. The following year, he officially retired from football.

== International career ==
Between 1924 and 1935, during the British rule in the country, Pal represented India national football team in their tours to Ceylon and Australia. He took part, and also captained in India's earliest known matches against visiting European teams. In 1924, he was appointed captain of the national team consisted both Indian and British players, that toured to Ceylon. Thus, he became India's first captain and the tour became first known official international tour by the team.

Pal was again selected in the Indian team for an away match against Ceylon in 1933 as the captain of IFA XI. He played against Ceylon in 1933 and led his side to 1–0 victory. In next year, he missed an opportunity to play for India in their South Africa tour due to injury, in which Sanmatha Dutta succeeded him in leading the team.

== Post-playing career ==
After retirement, Pal was associated with Mohun Bagan and scouted players for the team. In 1948, he took up the responsibility of secretaryship of the club temporarily when Balaidas Chatterjee went on to guide India at the Summer Olympics in London.

The following year, Pal was also appointed as the coach of the Bengal football team. He was responsible for promoting football activity in the region and helped develop the next generation of footballers.

Beside football, Pal also appeared in the silent era movie Gouri Shankar, which was directed by Anandamohan Roy, produced by National Pictures Limited, and released on 26 October 1932.

== Death ==
People know me because of this Mohun Bagan jersey. This jersey and club have taught me how to play. This is my most favorite possession. I respect this Green and Maroon jersey. I have told my sons that after I die, they must lay the jersey on me during my last journey. This is my last wish.

— Pal showing love for Mohun Bagan before death.

Pal died on 8 April 1976 in Kolkata, aged 79.

== Legacy ==
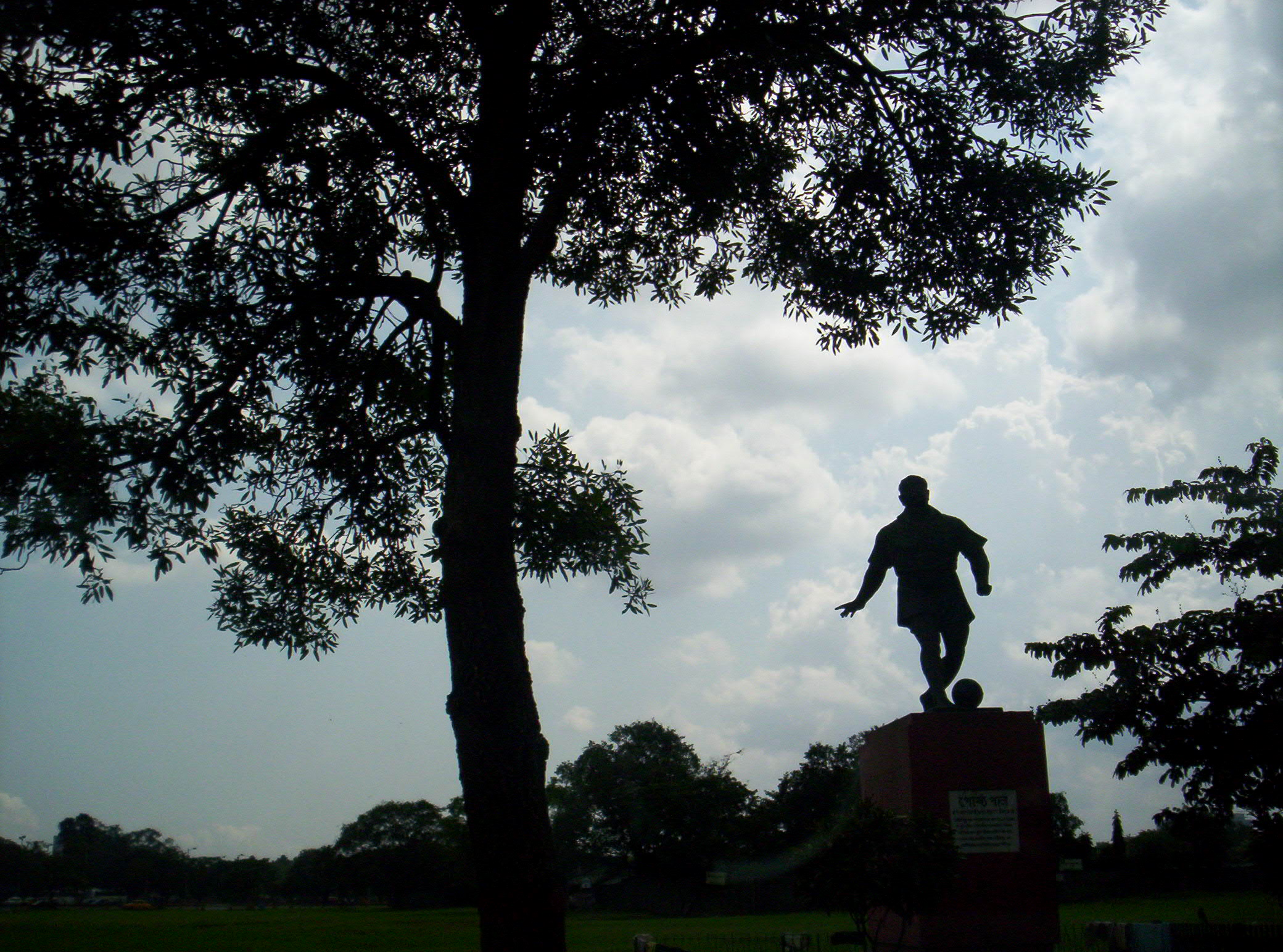
The statue of Gostha Pal at the Kolkata Maidan.

After his death, a statue was erected in memory of him at the Gostha Pal Sarani (named after him) in 1984, in opposite to the Eden Gardens at Kolkata Maidan area. The statue was unveiled by then PWD minister Jatin Chakraborty.

In 1998, a postage stamp dedicated to Pal, was unveiled in Calcutta by the India Post. Thus, he became the first Indian footballer to have a commemorative postage stamp in his honour. Later, within Mohun Bagan club tent, a museum has been built in his name. Gostha Pal Championship, named after him, under the aegis of All India Football Federation's 'Golden Baby Leagues', was incorporated to include more children from Kolkata into the football culture. In memory of him, Gostha Pal Football Academy was incorporated by the Government of West Bengal, in which noted Indian player Prasun Banerjee served as chief advisor.

In 2025, an in ink brand, named Koli keta launched Green and Maroon coloured inks tributing him.

== Honours ==
Mohun Bagan

- Cooch Behar Cup: 1931, 1935, 1936
- Calcutta Football League runner-up: 1916
- Asanullah Cup runner-up: 1916
- Rovers Cup runner-up: 1923
- IFA Shield runner-up: 1923

Awards

- Padma Shri in 1962, fourth highest civilian award in India (first footballer to receive the honour).
- Mohun Bagan AC awarded him the Mohun Bagan Ratna posthumously, which is given to former greats of that club, in 2004. The family of Gostha Pal returned the Mohun Bagan Ratna to Mohun Bagan Club in 2019 in protest of the lackadaisical attitude of the club towards the legend's memorabilia.

== See also ==
- List of people from Vidyasagar College Kolkata
- Football in Kolkata
- History of the India national football team
- List of India national football team captains
