= Chuni Goswami =

Indian footballer and cricketer (1938–2020)

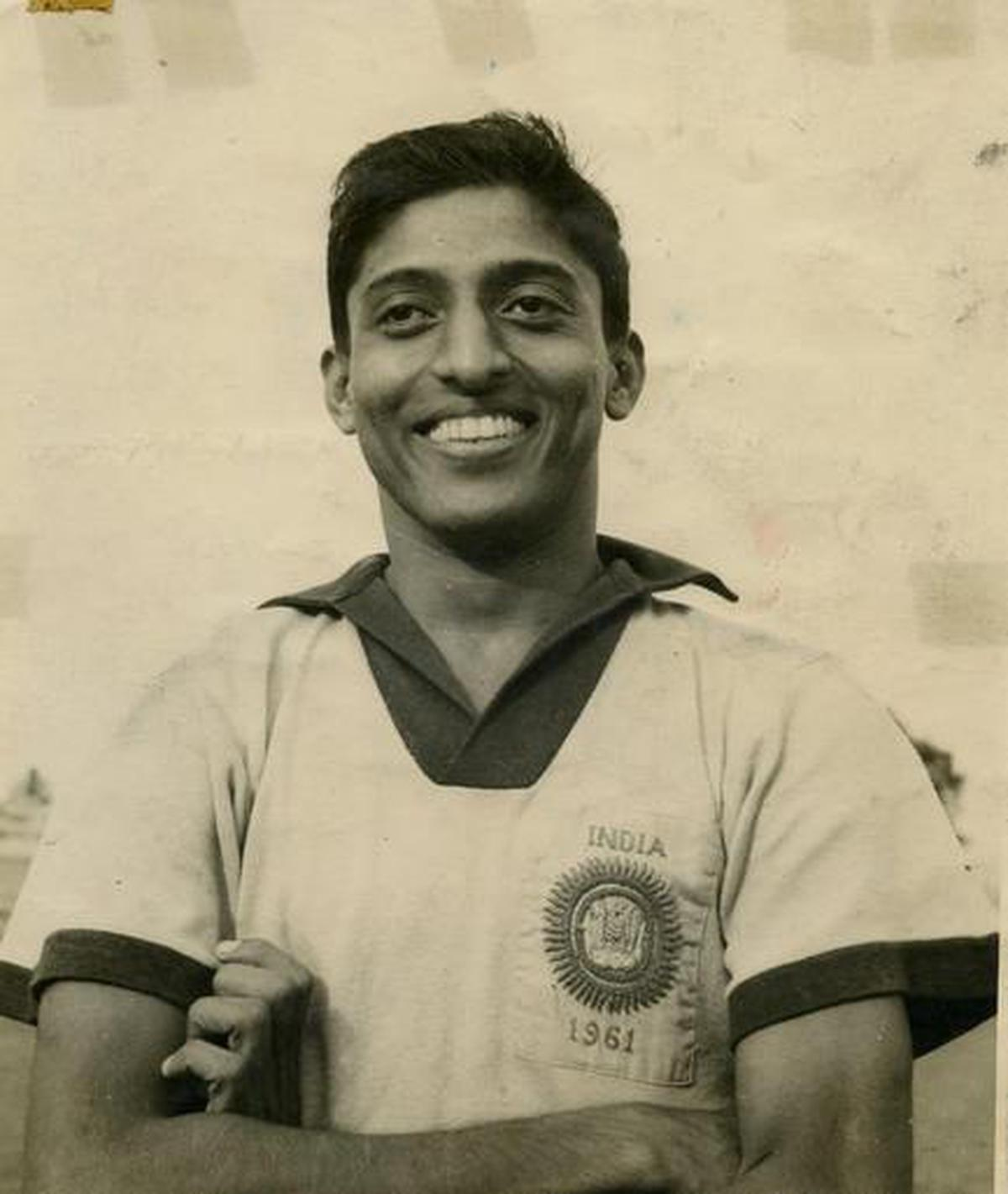
- Goswami with India in 1961

Personal information
- Birth name: Subimal Goswami
- Date of birth: 15 January 1938
- Place of birth: Kishoreganj, Bengal Presidency, British India (present-day in Dhaka Division, Bangladesh)
- Date of death: 30 April 2020 (aged 82)
- Place of death: Kolkata, West Bengal, India
- Height: 1.75 m (5 ft 9 in)
- Position: Striker

Youth career
- 1946–1954: Mohun Bagan

Senior career*
Years	Team	Apps	(Gls)
1954–1968	Mohun Bagan	296	(326)

International career^{‡}
1956–1964	India	37	(12)

Managerial career
- 1986–1989: Tata Football Academy (director)
- 1991–1995: India
Medal record
Men's football
Representing India
Asian Games
Gold medal – first place	1962 Jakarta	Team
AFC Asian Cup
Runner-up	1964 Israel	Team
- * Club domestic league appearances and goals as of 27 May 2008 ‡ National team caps and goals as of 27 May 2008

Subimal "Chuni" Goswami (15 January 1938 – 30 April 2020) was an Indian professional footballer and first-class cricketer. As footballer, he played as a striker or winger, captained both the Mohun Bagan club and the India national team. He is widely regarded as one of the greatest Asian players of all time. He also served as the Sheriff of Kolkata. Goswami scored 12 goals in 37 international appearances. He was an Olympian, represented India national team at the 1960 Summer Olympics. He also led the team to achieve the gold medal at the 1962 Asian Games, and earn the runners-up position at the 1964 AFC Asian Cup.

Playing for the India national team under coaching of Syed Abdul Rahim, Goswami was also a first class cricketer, playing Ranji Trophy for Bengal. He captained his team to the final of the tournament in 1971–72. On 15 January 2020, India Post issued a commemorative postage stamp in his honour. Goswami's autobiography Khelte Khelte was published in 1982.

== Personal life ==
Born in Kishoreganj, Bengal Presidency, Goswami moved to Calcutta and settled there in his childhood. His elder brother Manik Goswami was also a footballer who played for George Telegraph. Goswami was married to Basanti, who gave birth to their son. Goswami considered East Bengal legend Ahmed Khan as his idol. He also played tennis at the Calcutta South Club.

Goswami was elected as the Sheriff of Kolkata in 2005. He was a member of the CC&FC, and felicitated by the club, which is one of the oldest sports club in the world, founded in the late 18th century. He also served as president of Calcutta Veterans Club.

== Football career ==
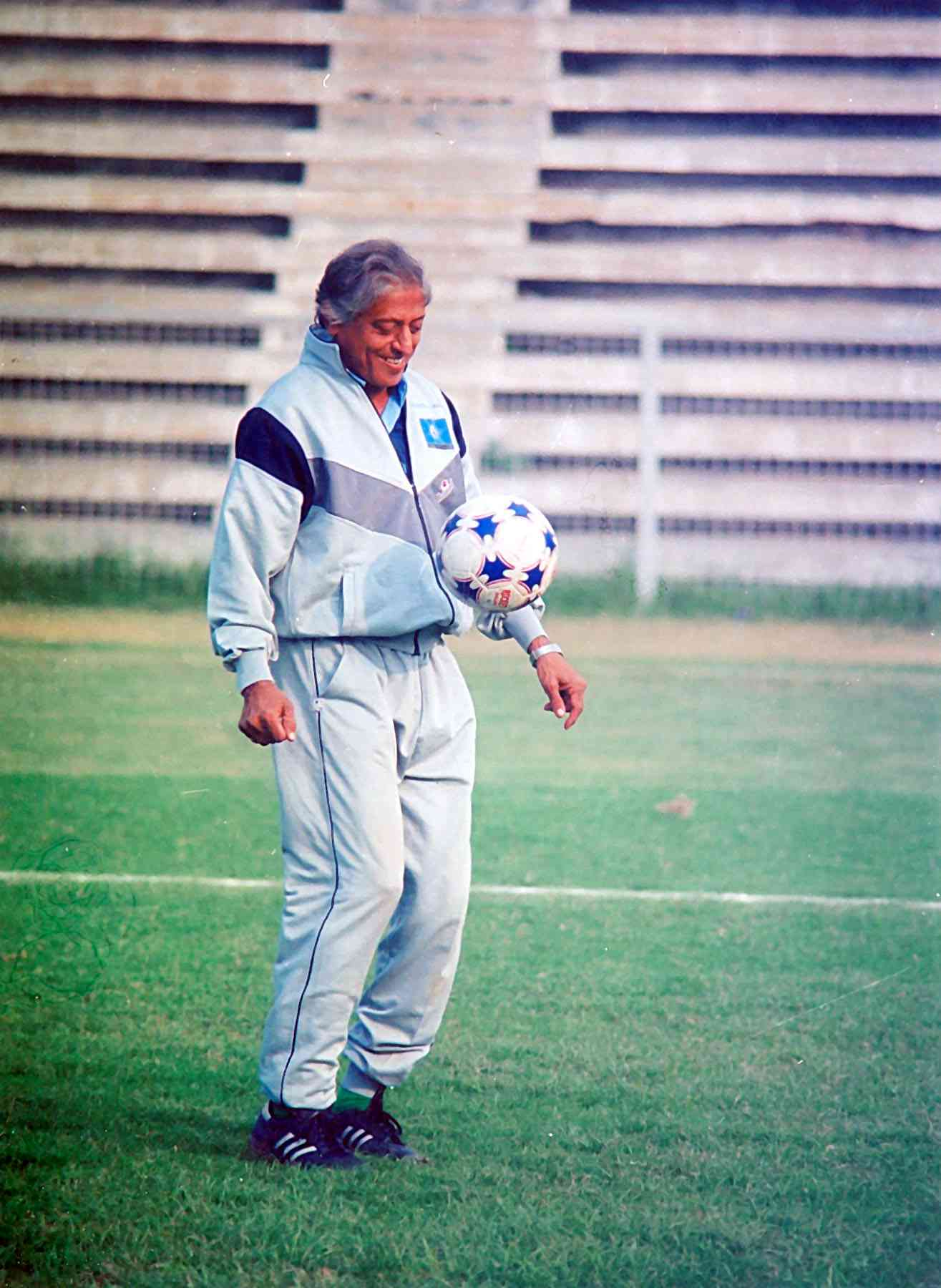
Chuni Goswami

Goswami began his playing career with the team of University of Calcutta and was appointed captain. He led them to win the All India Inter University Championships for the Sir Ashutosh Mukjerjee Trophy. In the final, he scored the match winner against University of Bombay. He later went on to represent Bengal in Santosh Trophy and was part of the 1956 title win with P. K. Banerjee's, against Mysore. Goswami also appeared in prestigious Merchant's Cup tournament, hosted by Calcutta Cricket and Football Club.

Chuni Goswami holds the distinction of playing for a single club, Mohun Bagan, throughout his club career despite numerous offers from other clubs including one reported offer from Tottenham Hotspur.

Chuni Goswami was the poster boy of Indian football. He was a top-class player with dribbling, passing, his ball control was better than anybody else. His passing and his through passes were excellent. He could assist strikers like Neville D'Souza and make them score with his beautiful passes.

— Gautam Roy, football historian, on Chuni Goswami to the Olympic Channel.

=== Club career ===
Goswami joined the Mohun Bagan junior team in 1946 at the age of 8 years. He was a part of the junior squad up to 1954 and then graduated to the Mohun Bagan senior team. Mentored by club legend Balaidas Chatterjee, Goswami went on to represent Mohun Bagan in various foreign tours. He made his club debut on 29 May in the same year in Mohun Bagan's 3–0 win against Eastern Railway, in which he scored a goal. In the 1959 CFL season, Goswami scored 14 goals for his team. He continued playing for Mohun Bagan until his retirement in 1968. In the 1960s, Goswami and Jarnail Singh became two highest-paid players of the club; both of them captained the team respectively. Goswami captained Mohun Bagan in five seasons from 1960 to 1964. During his stay at the club, he won the Calcutta Football League six times, IFA Shield and Durand Cup four times.

=== International career ===
Chuni Goswami made his international debut for India in 1956 during the team's 1–0 victory over the Chinese Olympic team. He went on to play for India in 30 international matches including in Olympics, Asian Games, Asia Cup and Merdeka Cup, scoring 9 goals. He captained India to the Asian Games Gold Medal in 1962 and a Silver in the 1964 AFC Asian Cup in Tel Aviv and in the Merdeka Cup. Goswami, known for having incredible partnership with P. K. Banerjee and Tulsidas Balaram, is one of the "Indian football's holy trinity".

== Career statistics ==
=== International statistics ===
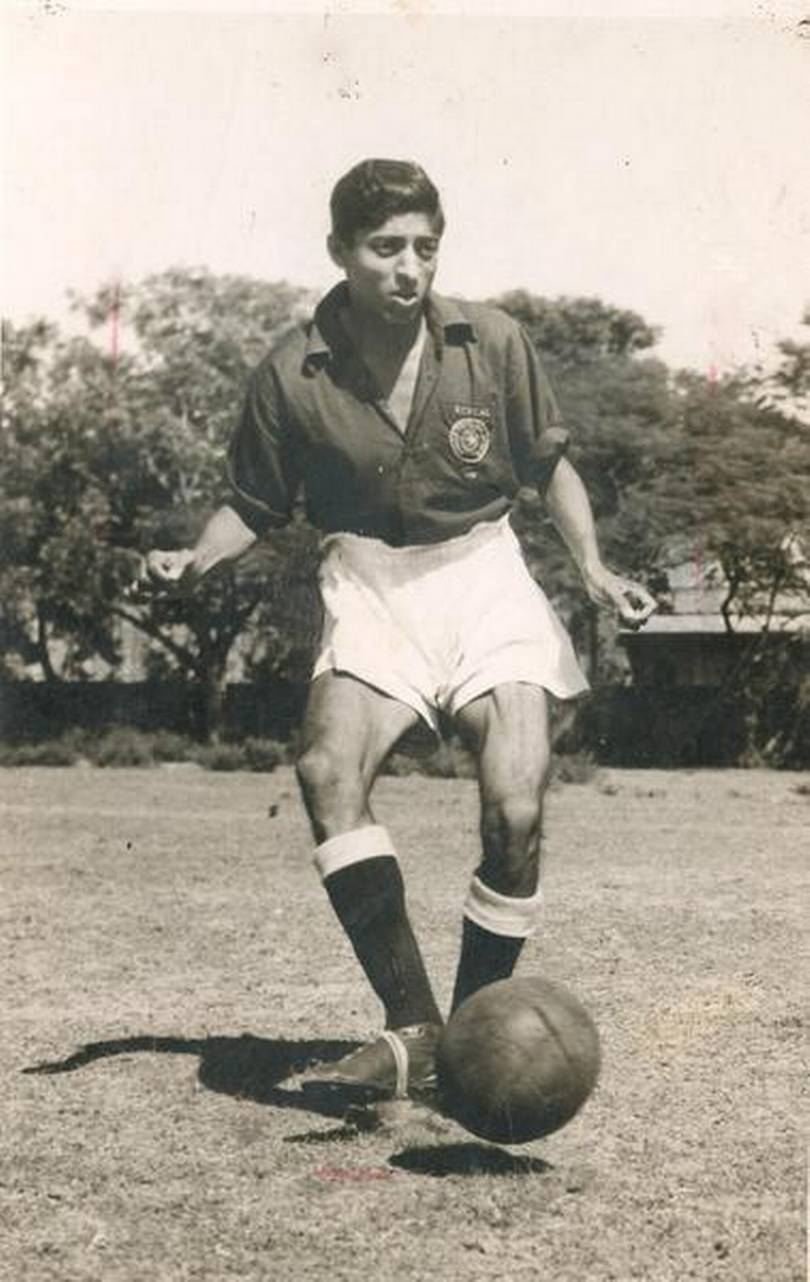
Goswami playing for India national football team in 1959.

Chuni Goswami played in 37 "A" international matches having scored 12 times for the National team.

India national team
Year	Apps	Goals
1958	5	2
1959	7	2
1960	5	1
1961	3	0
1962	5	3
1963	2	0
1964	10	4
Total	37	12

=== International goals ===
Date	Venue	Opponent	Result	Competition	Goals
26 May 1958	Korakuen Velodrome, Tokyo	Burma	3–2	1958 Asian Games	1
30 May 1958	Tokyo Football Stadium, Tokyo	Hong Kong	5–2	1958 Asian Games	1
27 August 1959	Ghazi Stadium, Kabul	Afghanistan	5–2	1960 Olympic Qualifier	1
11 December 1959	Maharaja's College Stadium, Kochi	Iran	3−1	1960 AFC Asian Cup qualification	1
30 April 1960	Gelora Bung Karno Stadium, Jakarta	Indonesia	2–0	1960 Olympic Qualifier	1
28 August 1962	Senayan Stadium, Jakarta	Thailand	4–1	1962 Asian Games	1
1 September 1962	Senayan Stadium, Jakarta	South Vietnam	3–2	1962 Asian Games	2
2 June 1964	Bloomfield Stadium, Tel Aviv	Hong Kong	3–1	1964 AFC Asian Cup	1
19 June 1964	Rabindra Sarobar Stadium, Calcutta	Iran	1–3	1964 Olympic Qualifier	1
27 August 1964	Kuala Lumpur, Malaya	Cambodia	4–0	1964 Merdeka Tournament	1
29 August 1964	Kuala Lumpur, Malaya	Thailand	2–1	1964 Merdeka Tournament	1

== Honours ==
Mohun Bagan

- Durand Cup: 1959, 1960, 1963, 1964, 1965
- IFA Shield: 1960, 1961, 1962, 1967
- Rovers Cup: 1966
- Calcutta Football League: 1959, 1960, 1962, 1963, 1964, 1965

India

- Asian Games Gold medal: 1962
- AFC Asian Cup runners-up: 1964
- Merdeka Tournament runner-up: 1964

Bengal

- Santosh Trophy: 1955–56, 1958–59, 1959–60

Individual

- Mohun Bagan Ratna Award: 2001
- Banga Bibhushan: 2013

Records

- Top goal scorer of Calcutta Football League (with 145 goals)

Accolades

- Sportskeeda All time Indian Football XI

== Cricket career ==
Chuni Goswami
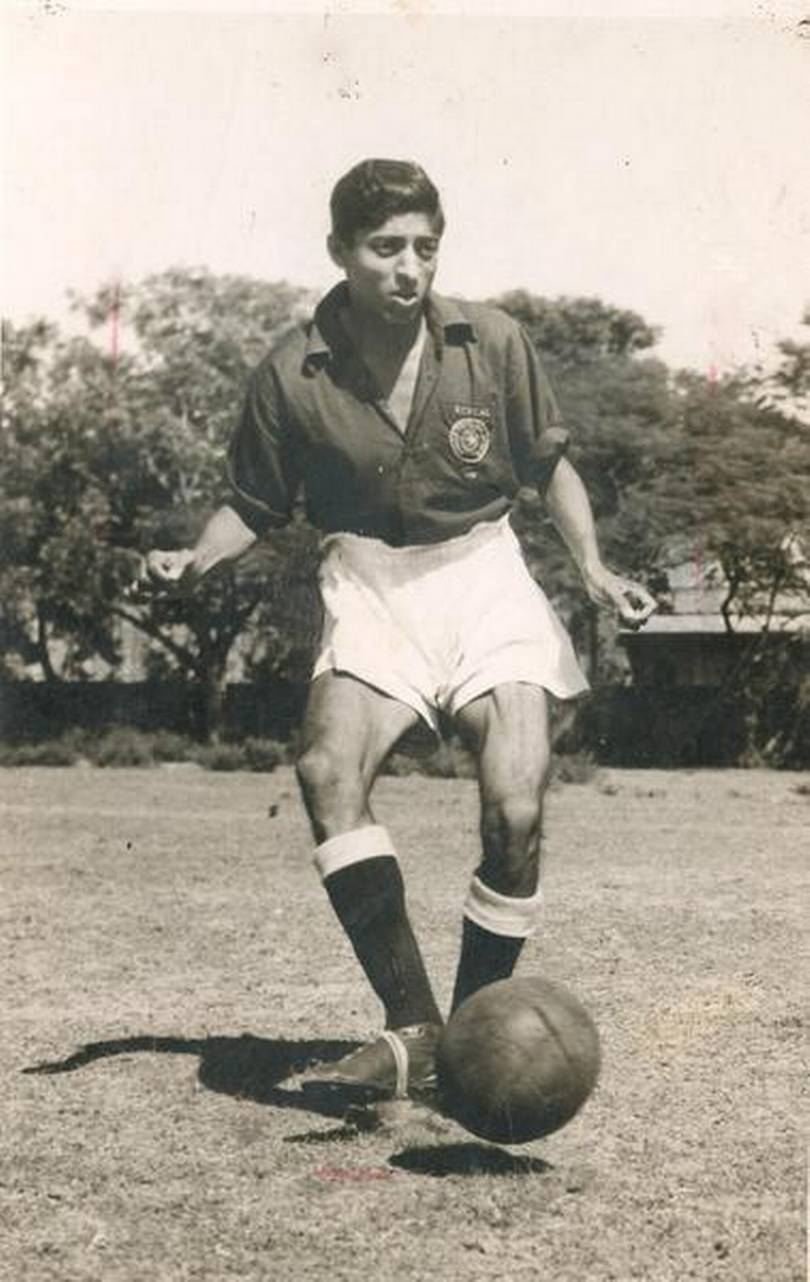

Cricket information
- Batting: Right-handed
- Bowling: Right arm fast medium
- Role: All-rounder

Domestic team information
- Years: Team
- 1962–1973: Bengal

Career statistics
Competition	FC
Matches	46
Runs scored	1592
Batting average	28.42
100s/50s	1/7
Top score	103
Balls bowled	2917
Wickets	47
Bowling average	24.08
5 wickets in innings	1
10 wickets in match	0
Best bowling	5/47
Catches/stumpings	40/–
- Source: ESPNcricinfo, 7 March 2014

Chuni Goswami made his first class debut for Bengal in the Ranji Trophy during the 1962–63 season. He was a Right Handed Batsman and a Right Arm Medium Pacer. After retiring from football, Goswami fully focussed on playing cricket for West Bengal. He appeared in two Ranji Trophy finals, losing to Mumbai each time. In the 1968–69 final, he scored 96 and 84; but Ajit Wadekar's century helped Mumbai win on first innings lead. Later, he led the Bengal cricket team to a 1972 Ranji Trophy final which they lost to Mumbai for whom Gavaskar and Shivalkar starred. Playing for Combined East and Central Zone team against the touring West Indies side in December 1966, Chuni Goswami took 8 wickets in the match as his team surprisingly beat the tourists by an innings. In his cricket career, which spanned up to the 1972–73 season, he played 46 first class matches, scoring 1,592 runs with one century and seven fifties, and took 47 wickets.

== Managerial career ==
Goswami later became team official of Mohun Bagan and went with Karuna Bhattacharya managed team to newly independent Bangladesh in May 1972, where they defeated Dhaka Mohammedan in first match, but lost to Shadhin Bangla football team in their last match. He later became director of Tata Football Academy in 1986, and also managed India national football team in 1991–95.

== Death ==
Goswami died on 30 April 2020 at the age of 82 in Kolkata after a prolonged illness. For the last few months, Goswami was suffering from underlying ailments with diabetes, prostate infection and neurological problems. His family confirmed that Goswami was admitted to a city hospital earlier in the day and died at 5 pm after a cardiac arrest.

== Awards ==
Goswami won numerous awards during his playing career as well as after retirement for his contribution towards Indian football. The prominent awards won by him are:

- 1958 – Best Footballer Award by Kolkata Veterans Sports Club
- 1962 – Best Striker of Asia Award
- 1963 – Arjuna award
- 1983 – Padma Shri award
- 2005 – Mohan Bagan Ratna

== Legacy ==
At the 123rd edition of the prestigious IFA Shield, best player of the tournament award was renamed as 'Chuni Goswami Memorial Award for the Best Player' in honour of Goswami.

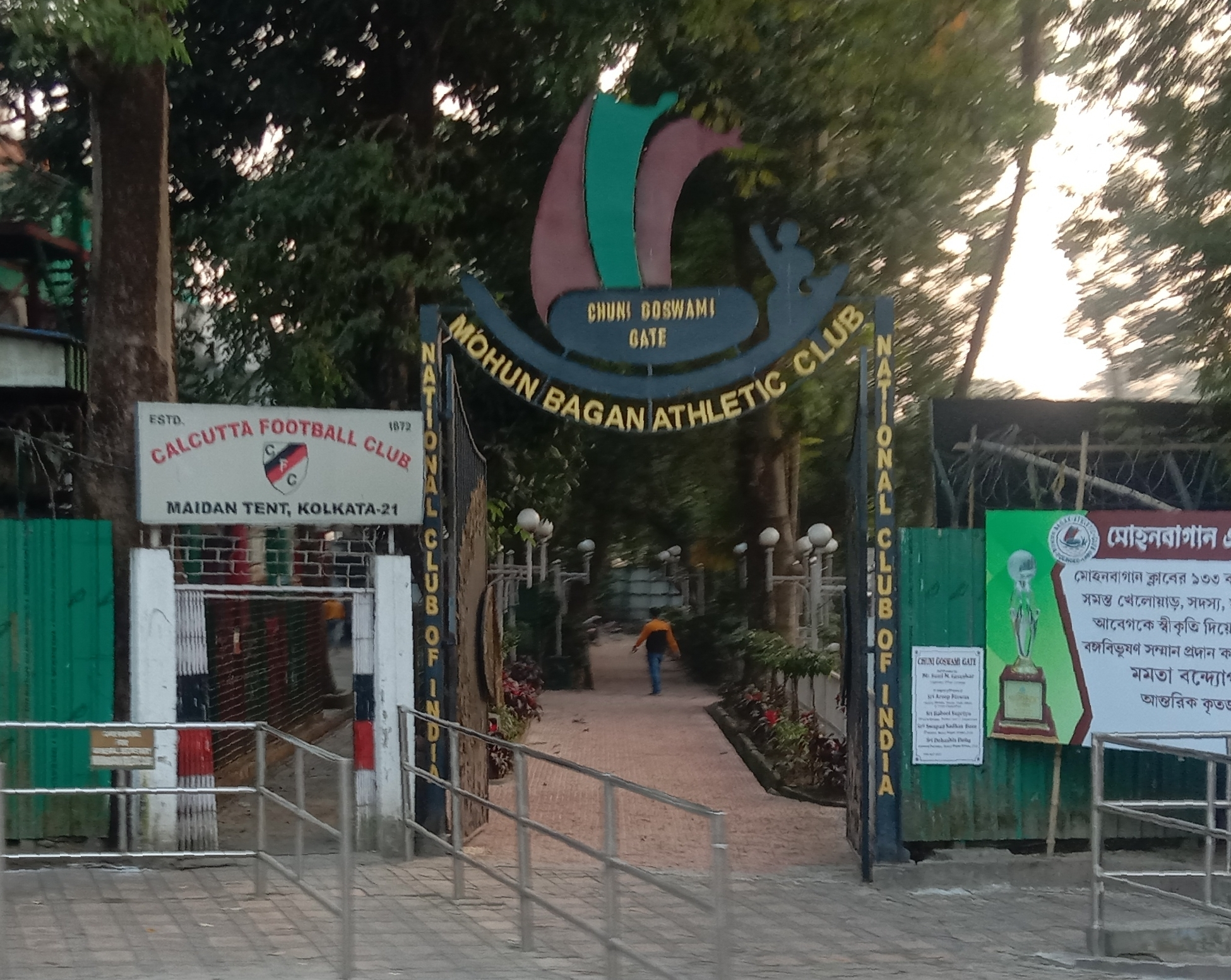
Chuni Goswami Gate of Mohun Bagan Athletic Club in right, and Gate of the Calcutta Football Club of CC&FC, in Kolkata Maidan, December 2023.

On 15 April 2023, iconic "Chuni Goswami Gate" was unveiled by former Indian international cricketer Sunil Gavaskar at the Mohun Bagan club headquarters in Kolkata, in memory of him.

== See also ==
- List of one-club men in association football
- List of India national football team captains
- History of the India national football team
- Football at the Asian Games
- India national football team at the Olympics

== Bibliography ==
- Kapadia, Novy (2017). Barefoot to Boots: The Many Lives of Indian Football. Penguin Random House. ISBN 978-0-143-42641-7.
- Martinez, Dolores; Mukharjiim, Projit B (2009). Football: From England to the World: The Many Lives of Indian Football. Routledge. ISBN 978-1-138-88353-6. Archived from the original on 2 July 2022.
- Nath, Nirmal (2011). History of Indian Football: Upto 2009–10. Readers Service. ISBN 9788187891963. Archived from the original on 22 July 2022.
- Dineo, Paul; Mills, James (2001). Soccer in South Asia: Empire, Nation, Diaspora. London, United Kingdom: Frank Cass Publishers. ISBN 978-0-7146-8170-2. Archived from the original on 25 July 2022.
- "Triumphs and Disasters: The Story of Indian Football, 1889—2000" (PDF). Archived from the original (PDF) on 13 August 2012.
- Mukhopadhay, Subir (2018). সোনায় লেখা ইতিহাসে মোহনবাগান (transl. Mohun Bagan in the history written in gold). ISBN 978-93-850172-0-9.
- Majumdar, Boria, Bandyopadhyay, Kausik (2006). Goalless: The Story of a Unique Footballing Nation. Penguin India. ISBN 9780670058747.
- Banerjee, Argha; Basu, Rupak (2022). মোহনবাগান: সবুজ ঘাসের মেরুন গল্প (transl. Mohun Bagan: Green fields' Maroon stories). Shalidhan. ISBN 978-81-954667-0-2.
- Majumdar, Boria; Bandyopadhyay, Kausik (2006). A Social History Of Indian Football: Striving To Score. Routledge. ISBN 9780415348355. Archived from the original on 29 June 2021.
- Basu, Jaydeep (2003). Stories from Indian Football. UBS Publishers' Distributors. ISBN 9788174764546. Archived from the original on 11 October 2022.
- Sarkar, Dhiman (25 March 2018). "India's football past gasping for survival". hindustantimes.com. Kolkata: Hindustan Times. Archived from the original on 6 January 2022.
- Nag, Utathya (19 April 2023). "Calcutta Football League: East Bengal kings of Asia's oldest league competition — full winners list". olympics.com. The Olympics Football. Archived from the original on 5 May 2023.
- Sengupta, Somnath (14 May 2018). "Legends of Indian Football : Peter Thangaraj". thehardtackle.com. Mumbai: The Hard Tackle. Archived from the original on 13 April 2021.
- Sengupta, Somnath; Ghosh, Aindrila; Sengupta, Bhaktimoy (23 August 2013). ""Lack of Focus on Youth Development Is The Biggest Problem of Indian Football" – Arun Ghosh (Exclusive Interview)". thehardtackle.com. Kolkata: The Hard Tackle. Archived from the original on 27 January 2022.
- "IN THE CITY 05-03-2014 — Felicitation". telegraphindia.com. Kolkata: The Telegraph India. 5 March 2014. Archived from the original on 5 October 2023.
- "From facing death to playing through pain: The story of Jarnail Singh, Indian football's gutsy hero". scroll.in. Scroll. 25 June 2020. Archived from the original on 30 December 2021.
- Bhattacharya, Ayan (10 September 2023). "বাংলা ভাগের ক্ষত কিভাবে বিষিয়ে দিল মোহনবাগান আর ইস্টবেঙ্গলকে?" [How did the wound of the partition of Bengal poisoned both Mohun Bagan and East Bengal?]. inscript.me (in Bengali). Kolkata: ইনস্ক্রিপ্ট বাংলা নিউজ. Archived from the original on 7 November 2023.
- "Indian Football's Enduring Light, P.K. Banerjee Passes Away at 83". thewire.in. Kolkata: The Wire. PTI. 20 March 2020. Archived from the original on 21 March 2020.
- "Indian Football Legend PK Banerjee Dies At 83". outlookindia.com. Kolkata: Outlook India News. PTI. 20 March 2020. Archived from the original on 23 October 2020.
- "Sports in West Bengal". wbpolice.gov.in. West Bengal Police. Archived from the original on 28 September 2023.
