= List of India national football team captains =

This article lists all the captains of the India national football team.

The first India captain in their maiden international tour was Gostha Pal, organised under the control of Indian Football Association (Bengal) before the formation of All India Football Federation in 1937. The first captain to lead India in their first AIFF organised international tour was Karuna Bhattacharya, who captained India in their first international match against Australia on 3 September 1938.

The following table includes players who have captained the India national football team, along with the vice-captains and the international tournaments they led in.

== List of captains ==
Bold indicates current captain
Reserve captains include vice-captains and others who captained in place of the incumbent in international competitive matches and friendlies

Tenure	Incumbent	Reserve captains	Tournaments/Notes	Ref.
1933	Gostha Pal	Sanmatha Dutta, Karuna Bhattacharya	All India XI / IFA XI; First All-India national team organised by IFA (Bengal)	
1934–1936	Sanmatha Dutta		All India XI / IFA XI	
1938	Karuna Bhattacharya		First All-India national team organised by AIFF (India tour of Australia 1938)	
1948	Talimeren Ao		1948 Summer Olympics	
1949–1954	Sailen Manna	Ahmed Khan	1951 Asian Games, 1952 Colombo Cup, 1952 Summer Olympics, 1953 Colombo Cup, 1954 Colombo Cup, 1954 Asian Games	
1955; 1958	Sayed Khwaja Aziz-ud-Din		1955 Colombo Cup, 1958 Asian Games	
1956	Samar Banerjee	Neville D'Souza, J. Krishnaswamy	1956 Summer Olympics	
1959–1960	Sheikh Abdul Latif		1959 Merdeka Tournament	
1960–1961	P. K. Banerjee		1961 Merdeka Tournament, 1960 Summer Olympics	
1962–1964	Chuni Goswami		1962 Asian Games, 1964 AFC Asian Cup, 1964 Merdeka Tournament	
1965–1967	Jarnail Singh		1965 Merdeka Tournament, 1966 Merdeka Tournament, 1966 Asian Games, 1967 Merdeka Tournament	
1967–1968	Arun Ghosh		1968 Merdeka Tournament	
1969; 1973	Inder Singh		1969 Merdeka Tournament, 1973 Merdeka Tournament	
1970	Syed Nayeemuddin		1970 Merdeka Tournament, 1970 Asian Games	
1971	Chandreshwar Prasad		1971 Merdeka Tournament, 1971 Pesta Sukan Cup	
1971	Arun Ghosh			
1972	Mohammed Habib			
1974	Magan Singh Rajvi	Ranjit Thapa	1974 Merdeka Tournament, 1974 Asian Games	
1976–1977	Pradip Chowdhury	Gurdev Singh Gill		
1978	Gurdev Singh Gill		1978 Asian Games	
1980	Prasun Banerjee	A. Devraj Doraiswamy		
1981–1982	Bhaskar Ganguly		1981 Merdeka Tournament, 1982 Nehru Cup, 1982 President's Cup, 1982 Merdeka Tournament, 1982 Asian Games	
1982	Shabbir Ali			
1982; 1984	Prasanta Banerjee		1984 Nehru Cup	
1982	Parminder Singh			
1982–1983	Brahmanand Sankhwalkar		1983 Nehru Cup	
1982	Pem Dorji			
1982	Biswajit Bhattacharya			
1982	Monoranjan Bhattacharya			
1984–1986; 1988–1989	Sudip Chatterjee	Biswajit Bhattacharya, Tarun Dey	1984 AFC Asian Cup, 1985 Nehru Cup, 1985 South Asian Games, 1986 Merdeka Tournament, 1986 Asian Games, 1988 Nehru Cup, 1989 South Asian Games	
1986	Atanu Bhattacharya	Mauricio Afonso	1986 Nehru Cup	
1987	Abdul Majeed Kakroo		1987 Nehru Cup	
1987	Babu Mani		1987 South Asian Games	
1989	Mauricio Afonso		1989 Nehru Cup	
1991	Bikash Panji		1991 Nehru Cup	
1992	Krishanu Dey			
1993–1995	V. P. Sathyan		1993 Nehru Cup, 1993 SAARC Gold Cup, 1993 South Asian Games; 1995 Nehru Cup, 1995 SAARC Gold Cup	
1995–1996; 1997; 1999	Bruno Coutinho		1995 South Asian Games, 1997 Nehru Cup, 1999 SAFF Gold Cup	
1996; 1998; 1999	I. M. Vijayan		1998 Asian Games	
1997	Carlton Chapman		1997 SAFF Gold Cup	
1999; 2001; 2003	Jo Paul Ancheri		1999 South Asian Games, 2001 Merdeka Tournament	
2000	Roberto Fernandes			
2000–2011	Bhaichung Bhutia	I. M. Vijayan, Debjit Ghosh, Shanmugam Venkatesh, Renedy Singh, Climax Lawrence	2005 SAFF Gold Cup, 2007 Nehru Cup, 2008 SAFF Championship, 2008 AFC Challenge Cup, 2009 Nehru Cup, 2011 AFC Asian Cup	
2001	Basudeb Mondal			
2003	Debjit Ghosh		2003 SAFF Gold Cup	
2005	Shanmugam Venkatesh			
2009	Renedy Singh			
2011	Climax Lawrence		2011 SAFF Championship	
2015	Subrata Pal			
2012–2024	Sunil Chhetri	Gouramangi Singh, Gurpreet Singh Sandhu, Sandesh Jhingan, Rahul Bheke	2012 AFC Challenge Cup, 2012 Nehru Cup, 2013 SAFF Championship, 2015 SAFF Championship, 2018 Intercontinental Cup, 2019 AFC Asian Cup, 2019 King's Cup, 2019 Intercontinental Cup, 2021 SAFF Championship, 2023 Tri-Nation Series; 2023 Intercontinental Cup, 2023 SAFF Championship; 2023 AFC Asian Cup	
2016; 2023; 2024–	**Gurpreet Singh Sandhu**	Rahul Bheke, Sandesh Jhingan	2023 King's Cup, 2024 Intercontinental Cup, 2025 CAFA Nations Cup	
2017; 2025	Sandesh Jhingan	Sunil Chhetri, Rahul Bheke	2017 Tri-Nation Series	
2018	Subhasish Bose		2018 SAFF Championship	
2026	Chinglensana Singh Konsham		2026 SAFF Championship	

=== Captains by major tournaments ===
- **Bold** indicates tournament winners
- Italics indicates tournament hosts

Player	Tournament(s)
Talimeren Ao	1948 Summer Olympics
Sailen Manna	**1951 Asian Games**; 1952 Summer Olympics; 1954 Asian Games
Samar Banerjee	1956 Summer Olympics
Sayed Khwaja Aziz-ud-Din	1958 Asian Games
P. K. Banerjee	1960 Summer Olympics
Chuni Goswami	**1962 Asian Games**; 1964 AFC Asian Cup
Jarnail Singh	1966 Asian Games
Syed Nayeemuddin	1970 Asian Games
Magan Singh Rajvi	1974 Asian Games
Gurdev Singh Gill	1978 Asian Games
Bhaskar Ganguly	1982 Asian Games
Sudip Chatterjee	1984 AFC Asian Cup; 1986 Asian Games
I. M. Vijayan	1998 Asian Games
Bhaichung Bhutia	**2008 AFC Challenge Cup**; 2011 AFC Asian Cup
Sunil Chhetri	2012 AFC Challenge Cup; 2019 AFC Asian Cup; 2023 AFC Asian Cup
