= Football in Kolkata =

Location map of professional football clubs in the city of Kolkata

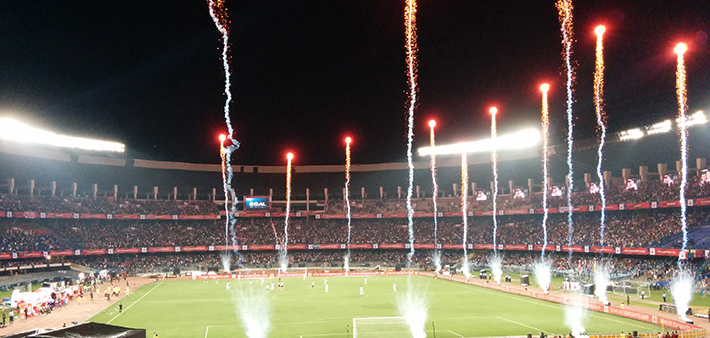
The inauguration of the Indian Super League at the Salt Lake Stadium in 2014.

Football is one of the most popular sports in Kolkata, West Bengal. East Bengal, Mohun Bagan and Mohammedan are the heart of Kolkata football. The rivalry between Mohun Bagan and East Bengal, originating from the Calcutta Football League as the Kolkata derby, is one of the fiercest in the world and considered among the flagship events in the Indian footballing calendar. Kolkata is known to be the Mecca of Indian football, with the two most supported teams in the city of Kolkata – Mohun Bagan and East Bengal, whereas Mohammedan Sporting having a pan India fan base. The city is also home to the biggest football stadium in India, the Vivekananda Yuba Bharati Krirangan, which as of 2015 has a capacity of 85,000. The record attendance of 131,781 came in a match between the said two teams in the semifinal of the 1997 Federation Cup.

== Notable footballers who have visited Kolkata ==
Because it is often called India's football capital, many international footballing personalities have visited Kolkata. In 1977, Mohun Bagan played a friendly match against the famous North American Soccer League club New York Cosmos, which featured Pelé. The match, which took place at Eden Gardens, had an attendance of 80,000. The match ended 2–2. Others who have visited Kolkata are Argentinean footballing legend Diego Maradona and current star Lionel Messi. Lionel Messi made his captaincy debut for his national side in Kolkata's Vivekananda Yuba Bharati Krirangan on 2 September 2011 against Venezuela. German legends, including Franz Beckenbauer and Oliver Kahn, have also visited. The best goalkeeper in football history, Russian Lev Yashin, visited in 1955 and 1973. English World Cup–winning legend Bobby Moore was the chief guest during the 1984 Nehru Cup. Emeka Ezuego, the Nigerian World Cup player, played for East Bengal and Mohammedan Sporting. Majid Bishkar, the Iranian World Cup player, played for East Bengal and Mohammedan Sporting from 1980 to 1986. Cameroon footballing legend Roger Milla played for Diamond Club in some exhibition matches in the Centenary Celebration of Mohun Bagan. Uruguay football captain Diego Forlan visited Kolkata in 2010. Karl-Heinz Rummenigge visited in 2010. Julian Caminho visited Kolkata twice—first in 1988 to play for East Bengal and again in 2011. MacDonald Mukansi played for East Bengal in 2007.

Oliver Kahn played his final career appearance for Bayern Munich (though technically a friendly/testimonial tour match) against Mohun Bagan on May 27, 2008, at the Salt Lake Stadium in Kolkata, India.

Others who have also visited are Terry Paine, Carlos Alberto Torres, Enzo Francescoli, Valencia Ramos, Jorge Burruchaga, Ricardo Gareca, László Kiss, Nicky Butt, Włodzimierz Smolarek, Andrzej Buncol, Eusébio, Ronald Koeman, Paul Breitner, and Swansea City's Neil Taylor.

Notable players who appeared in Kolkata during the ISL's early years included Alessandro Del Piero, David Trezeguet, Robert Pirès, Luis Garcia, Elano, David James, Joan Capdevila, Freddie Ljungberg, Lúcio, Mikaël Silvestre, Roberto Carlos, Nicolas Anelka, Adrian Mutu, Hélder Postiga, Carlos Marchena, Simão Sabrosa, Diego Forlán, John Arne Riise, Florent Malouda, Aaron Hughes, Didier Zokora, Mohamed Sissoko, Robbie Keane, Dimitar Berbatov, Wes Brown, Miku and Marcelinho. Several appeared for Atlético de Kolkata (ATK), while others played against the club in league or other ISL matches.

In July 2023, Argentine World Cup and World Cup Golden Gloves winner Emiliano Martinez also visited the city of Joy, courtesy to Satadru Dutta's initiative. He was grandly welcomed by the citizens and Mohun Bagan and East Bengal.

Lionel Messi along with Rodrigo De Paul and Luis Suárez visited Kolkata as part of the opening leg of the GOAT India Tour 2025.

In September 2026, Cafu visited Kolkata as part of his five day India tour.

The Uruguay national football team visited Kolkata, India, in September 2026 as part of its Asian tour. The squad included several prominent international players, notably Darwin Núñez, Ronald Araújo, Rodrigo Bentancur, José María Giménez, Giorgian de Arrascaeta and Lucas Torreira. Federico Valverde was initially named in the squad but later withdrew after sustaining an ankle injury. The team trained in Kolkata ahead of its international friendly against India at Salt Lake Stadium in October 2026.

Brazil fielded several prominent players, including Vinícius Júnior, Marquinhos, Bruno Guimarães, Gabriel Magalhães, Endrick and Estêvão Willian, in a friendly encounter against the Indian national football team in September 2026. Raphinha was initially selected but withdrew from the squad after sustaining a thigh injury.

== Footballers from West Bengal ==
The state of West Bengal has contributed many legends to Indian football, such as:

- Chuni Goswami, first Padma Shri awardee, awarded best striker of Asia in 1962.
- Gostho Pal, footballer, who was member of the Mohun Bagan team that won the IFA shield against a British team in the pre-independence period.
- Krishanu Dey, footballer, known as the "Indian Maradona".
- Mohammed Salim, first player from the Indian subcontinent to play overseas, in the year 1936 for the Scottish Club Celtic FC.
- P. K. Banerjee, named Indian Footballer of the 20th Century by FIFA, and awardee of the FIFA Order of Merit.
- Shailen Manna, footballer, the only Asian Footballer ever to be named among the 10 best Captains in the world by the English FA in 1953.
- Subrata Paul, member of Indian team, first Indian goalkeeper to play professionally for a foreign club in 1st division (Danish Superliga).
- Sudip Chatterjee, footballer, considered among the finest in Indian football, declared AIFF player of the decade in 1994.

== International football ==
- Robin Dutt, former manager of Bundesliga club, Werder Bremen.
- Neil Taylor, Welsh footballer of half-Bengali origin.

== Arjuna award winners ==
- P. K. Banerjee
- Chuni Goswami
- Arun Lal Ghosh
- Prasun Banerjee
- Sudhir Karmakar
- Shanti Mullick
- Subrata Bhattacharya
- Deepak Kumar Mondal
- Subrata Pal

== Attendances ==
The Indian Super League clubs from Kolkata with the 2024-25 Indian Super League attendances:

#	Club	Average
1	Mohun Bagan	35,743
2	East Bengal	18,423
3	Mohammedan	4,095
Average per club		19,420

== See also ==
- Bengal Super League
- Football in West Bengal
- Mohammedan SC Futsal
- History of Indian football
- Kolkata Police Friendship Cup
