= History of football in India =

Overview of the history of association football in India

The history of football in India has been going ever since the mid 1800s. It was the national sport of India at one point. India is home to some of the oldest football clubs in the world, and the world's third oldest competition, the Durand Cup. Football in India was highly celebrated at its peak. The Indian football outfit was called the "Brazilians of Asia".

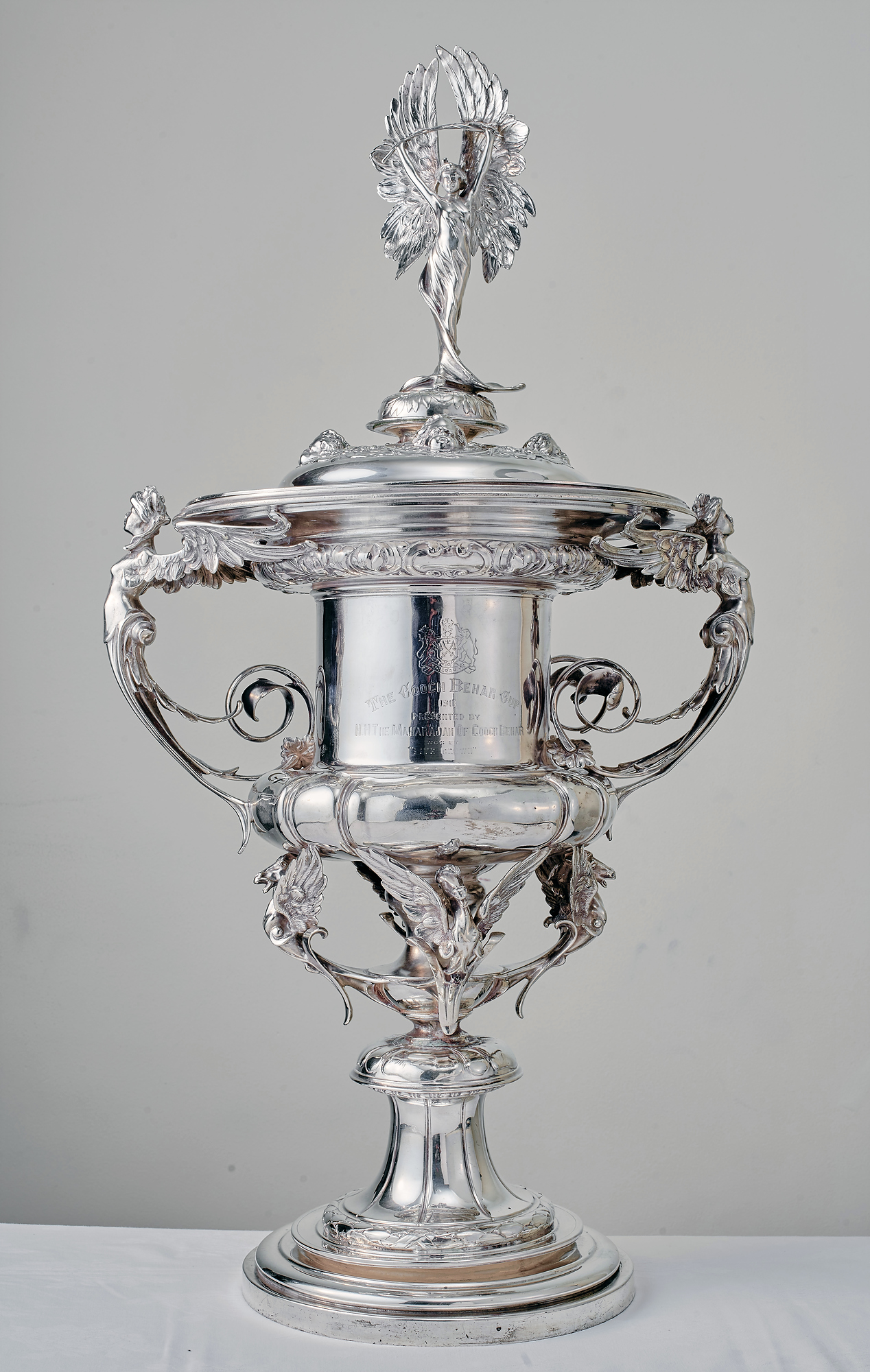
Silver trophy of the Cooch Behar Cup at The Bengal Club in Kolkata, which is one of the oldest football tournaments in India.

== 1800s ==
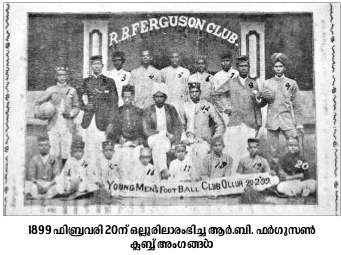
The 1899 R B Ferguson team

Football was introduced to India by British soldiers in the mid-nineteenth century. It spread because of the efforts of Nagendra Prasad Sarbadhikari. In 1888 the Durand Cup was founded by then India's Foreign Secretary, Mortimer Durand at Shimla, India. The Durand Cup is the third oldest football competition behind the FA Cup and the Scottish Cup. It was initiated, as a recreation for British troops stationed in India. Royal Scots Fusiliers won the first edition of the cup by beating Highland Light Infantry 2–1 in the final. In 1893, the IFA Shield was founded as the fourth oldest trophy in the world. Calcutta, then capital of British India, soon became the hub of Indian football. Sarada FC was the oldest Indian football club.

Calcutta FC was the first club to be established in 1872. Other early clubs include Dalhousie Club, Traders Club and Naval Volunteers Club.

In 1889 India's oldest current team Mohun Bagan A.C. was founded as "Mohun Bagan Sporting Club". This was the first club to be under the rule of the army. Both Hindus and Muslims players played in it. Several football clubs like Calcutta FC, Sovabazar and Aryan Club were established in Calcutta during the 1890s. Mohammedan Sporting Club was established in 1891. Tournaments like the Gladstone Cup, Trades Cup and Cooch Behar Cup also started around this time. R B Ferguson Football Club was established on February 20, 1899 in Thrissur, Kerala and it was the oldest football club in the southern part of India. The club was named after the Kochi Police Superintendent, R B Ferguson. The club was famed by the nickname Young Men's Football Club and played a huge role in promoting football in Kerala during the early 1900s.

The first Indian Federation, the Indian Football Association, was founded in 1893 but did not have a single Indian on its board.

== 1900–1950 ==
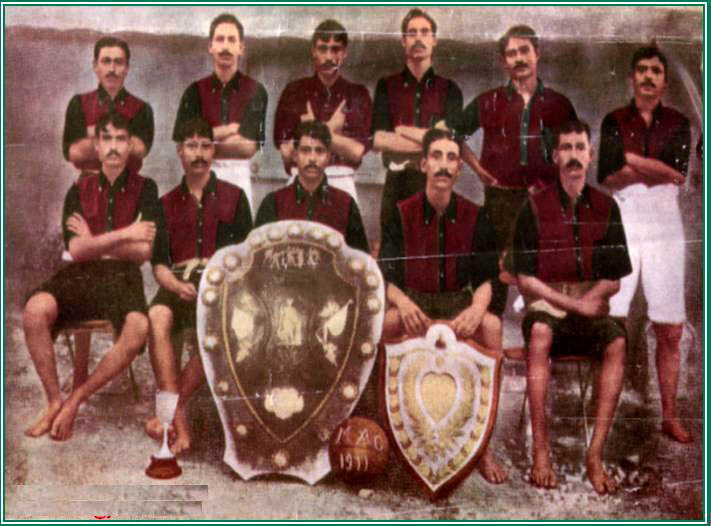
Mohun Bagan team, IFA Shield winners in 1911

Several clubs were founded, more Cup competitions were introduced and Indian players became more common. The major event that showed a rise in Indian Football was in 1911 when Mohun Bagan AC defeated East Yorkshire Regiment 2–1 in the final of the IFA Shield. This was the first time an Indian team won a major national tournament. The Durand Cup, first held in Shimla in 1888, was the first Indian football competition and is incidentally the third oldest surviving competition the World over. It was started by Sir Mortimer Durand.

In the 1940s "Aurora Football Club" the second newest club in southern India was formed in Kerala. It was formed by the football loving fans of Ollur (Thrissur) which started its football journey from Thrissur.

The first known official international tour by Indian team which consisted of both Indian and British players were in 1924, where the team was led by legendary Indian footballer Gostha Paul. Football teams consisting of entirely Indian players started to tour Australia, Japan, Indonesia, and Thailand during the late 1930s. The first international match India played before independence is yet to be verified, but the trace of first international match that India played overseas was against Ceylon in 1933. It was India's second International tour, where Gostha Paul led the Indian side to a victory over the host country with 1–0 score. On 4 July 1936 India played against visiting Chinese team, which was held at Calcutta. The match was a draw 1–1. After the success of several Indian football clubs abroad, the All India Football Federation (AIFF) was formed in 1937.

In 1938, India made an official tour to Australia where they played matches against many clubs and the Australian national side. From 3 September 1938 at Sydney, India played 5 friendly matches. At the Sydney match they saw a defeat of 5–3. Second match was at Brisbane, where the Indians fought back for a draw of 4–4. In the third match at Newcastle on 17 September, India registered their first win by a margin of 4–1. However, the Australians defeated India in the next two matches held at Sydney and Melbourne with a score of 5–4 and 3–1 respectively.

In 1941, the leading regional tournament Santosh Trophy started by the Indian Football Association. It was named after the former president of the IFA, Sir Manmatha Nath Roy Chowdhury, the Maharaja of Santosh who had died aged 61 in 1939. The IFA later donated the Santosh Trophy to the AIFF.

On their way to 1948 London Olympics, Chinese team again visited India, where they played Mohammedan fc, East Bengal, Mohun Bagan then finally on 17 July 1948, a friendly match held at Kolkata, where they were defeated by the Indian national side by 0-1 score. The 1948 London Olympics was India's first major international tournament, where a predominately barefooted Indian team lost 2–1 to France, failing to convert two penalties. The Indian team was greeted and appreciated by the crowd for their sporting manner."The French had been given a run for their money – and that, too, by the barefooted Indians!", the British media expressed. At a press conference, shortly after, the Indians were asked why they played barefooted. The ever witty then Indian captain Talimeren Ao said, “Well, you see, we play football in India, whereas you play BOOTBALL!” which was applauded by the British. The next day, that comment was splashed in the newspapers of London. Sarangapani Raman scored the only goal for India in that match and thus the first Indian international goal ever in the Olympics.

== The 1950 World Cup ==
India qualified by default for the 1950 FIFA World Cup finals as a result of the withdrawal of all of their scheduled opponents. But the governing body AIFF decided against going to the World Cup, being unable to understand the importance of the event at that time. Reason shown by AIFF was that there was the cost of travel, although FIFA agreed to bear a major part of the travel expenses, lack of practice time, team selection issues and valuing Olympics over FIFA World cup.

Although FIFA imposed a rule banning barefoot play following 1948 Olympics where India had played barefoot, the suggestion that the Indian team refused to play because they were not allowed to play barefoot is not entirely true; according to the then-Indian captain Sailen Manna, it was invented to cover up. The team had not made it past the first round of the FIFA World Cup Qualifiers until 2018, when they defeated Nepal 2–0 over the course of two home-and-away games.

== 1951–1962: The golden era of Indian football ==
The Indian team started the 1950s with victory in the 1951 Asian Games which they hosted. India beat both Indonesia and Afghanistan 3–0 to reach the final where they beat Iran 1–0. In 1952, India continued their form by winning the Colombo Quadrangular Cup held in Sri Lanka. This is called as the Golden time of Indian football. As four years earlier, many of the team played without boots but after the result in the Olympics AIFF immediately made it mandatory to wear boots.

India also won three further editions of the Quadrangular Cup, which were held in Burma, Calcutta and Dhaka in 1953, 1954 and 1955 respectively. India then went on to finish eighth in the 1954 Asian Games held in Manila.

At the 1956 Olympics they finished fourth, this is the second time India made history in the world of football. India first met hosts Australia, winning 4–2 with Neville D'Souza becoming the first Asian to score a hat trick in the Olympics and also making India the first Asian team to reach the Olympic semi-finals. They lost 4–1 to Yugoslavia, and lost the third place play-off match 3–0 to Bulgaria.

India participated in the 1958 Asian Games in Tokyo, Japan where they finished fourth, and the Merdeka Cup 1959 in Malaysia finishing second. The side started off 1960 with Asian Cup qualifiers in which they failed to qualify. India went on to win the 1962 Asian Games where they beat South Korea 2–1 in the final, and two years later finished second in the 1964 AFC Asian Cup which was held in round-robin format. India played in the Merdeka Cup in 1964, 1965 and 1966 where they finished 2nd, 3rd and 3rd.

== 1963–1984: Post-golden era ==
Rahim's death in the early '60s pegged Indian football back after a successful period. India played in the 1966 Asian Games in Bangkok but were eliminated in first round. India then took third place in the 1970 Asian Games, beating Japan 1–0 in the third place, play-off. In mid-'70s, Indian youth team jointly won the Youth Asian Cup with Iran. Indian football would go through a barren phase in '70s, '80s, and '90s, gradually losing its foothold as a top Asian team.

In 1984 India qualified for the 1984 Asian Cup. The team were placed in Group B but ended in last place after losing all but 1 match (which was a draw). India also failed to score during the Asian Cup as well which brought up questions about team selection.

Mohun Bagan AC created history again when they went on to win the IFA Shield in 1978 after a 2–2 draw against FC Ararat Yerevan from Soviet Union. The club became the first Indian side, post-independence, to win the title while competing with a non-Asian side.

East Bengal F.C. club went on to win the 1973 IFA Shield against Pyongyang City Sports Club of North Korea.

== 1985–2000 ==
India won gold medals in the SAF Games of both 1984 (in Dhaka) and 1987 (Calcutta). They won the inaugural SAARC Cup in 1993 in Lahore, and finished runner-up in Colombo two years later. By 1997 the competition had been renamed as the SAFF Cup, and India won it in both 1997 and 1999 edition, when they hosted it in Goa.

India also got a major boost when the All India Football Federation created the National Football League in 1996. This was India's first ever national domestic league.

== 2000–2010: The rebirth of Indian football ==
East Bengal F.C. club of Kolkata won the ASEAN Club Championship in 2003.

Although India failed to qualify for the 2004 Asian Cup, the senior team gained the silver medal in the inaugural Afro Asian Games, with victories over Rwanda and Zimbabwe (then 85 places ahead of India in the world rankings), losing the final 1–0 to Uzbekistan. As a result, Indian football has steadily earned greater recognition and respect, both within the country and abroad. In November 2003 then-India coach Stephen Constantine was named AFC Manager of the Month.

India lost to Pakistan and Bangladesh in the 2003 SAFF Cup, and defeats in the 2006 World Cup Qualification meant Stephen Constantine was sacked. The LG Cup win in Vietnam under Stephen Constantine was one of the few bright spots in the early part of the 2000s. It was India's first victory in a football tournament outside the subcontinent since 1974. India defeated hosts Vietnam 3–2 in the final despite trailing 2–0 after 30 minutes.

In 2005 Syed Nayeemuddin was appointed as India coach but he was immediately sacked the following year after heavy defeats in 2007 AFC Asian Cup qualifiers. Much traveled and experienced coach Bob Houghton was later appointed coach of the team in 2006. Under Houghton, India saw a huge revival in World Football. In August 2007, the Indian national team won the Nehru Cup for the first time in its history beating Syria 1–0. In August the following year, India defeated Tajikistan 4–1 to lift the 2008 AFC Challenge Cup and, in turn, qualified for the 2011 AFC Asian Cup in Qatar. In 2009 August, India again won the Nehru Cup beating Syria again but this time in penalties (6–5).

Club-wise Indian football took a turn for the better as the National Football League folded in 2006, and in 2007 the brand new I-League was started. The first I-League season was won by Goa club Dempo. During the 2008 AFC Cup Dempo made history when they made it all the way to the semi-finals of the AFC Cup, before losing out to Safa Beirut SC.

On 9 December 2010, it was announced that the AIFF had signed a new 15-year 700–crore deal with Reliance Industries and the International Management Group.

== 2011: The 2011 AFC Asian Cup ==
In the beginning of 2011 India took part in the AFC Asian Cup for the first time in 27 years. India were placed in Group C with Australia, Bahrain, and South Korea. On 10 January 2011 India played their first match against Australia where they lost 4–0. Then on 14 January 2011, India played Bahrain where again they lost 5–2 with Sunil Chhetri and Gouramangi Singh scoring. Then on 18 January 2011 India played their final match of the tournament against South Korea where they again lost 4–1. Sunil Chhetri was the goal scorer for India which meant that he scored the most goals for India in the tournament with two goals in three matches.

== 2011–2013: A new beginning ==
India played its first match in 2012 AFC Challenge Cup qualification on 21 Mar winning 3–0 against Chinese Taipei, with Jewel Raja Shaikh, Sunil Chhetri and Jeje Lalpekhlua scoring the goals. On 23 March they faced Pakistan. India came from behind and defeated Pakistan 3–1 with Jeje Lalpekhlua scoring 2 goals and Steven Dias scoring one. On 25 March they faced Turkmenistan and drew the game 1–1. The result meant that they finished on top of Group B and qualified for the 2012 AFC Challenge Cup.

In April 2011 Bob Houghton resigned as Indian coach after reports of racial abuse to an Indian referee during a match against Vietnam. In May 2011 the AIFF appointed Armando Colaco as Indian head coach. The Indian senior team defeated Qatar 2–1 in an international friendly game. India went on to lose the following World Cup qualifying encounter by 5–2 on aggregate over two legs, having contentiously suffered two red cards and two converted penalties in the first 23 minutes of the opening leg, which the UAE won by 3–0. The Indian national team went on a friendly tour to the Caribbean Islands, which turned out to be very unsuccessful. Recently they were beaten 2–1 by Guyana.

== 2013–present: The rise of Indian football ==
In 2013, a brand new competition called the Indian Super League was started. The first star-filled season was won by Kolkata club ATK. In 2016, Mohun Bagan AC became the first Indian club to qualify for the second round of AFC Champions League Qualifier, when they defeated the Tampine Rovers FC of Singapore on 27 January 2016. While also in 2016, Bengaluru FC became the only indian team to play in an AFC competition final, as they played in AFC cup 2016 final against Al-quwa al-jawiya in a losing effort.

The 2017 FIFA U-17 World Cup was hosted by India.

The Indian Women's League was planned since 2014 and got established in 2016, with the first season held in Cuttack. The league was India's first professional football league for women, following the Senior Women's National Football Championship started in 1991. Since 2019–20, the champions are playing in the AFC Women's Club Championship, the top tier women's club football competition in Asia.

Asian Premier Futsal Championship was held from 2016 to 2017 as Premier Futsal, featuring Paul Scholes, Falcão, Ronaldinho, Cafu, Míchel Salgado, Hernán Crespo, and Ryan Giggs as marquee players.

In 2021, the Indian Super League was given the premier division status over I-league, and with that FC Goa were able to play in the 2021 AFC champions league and also hosted all the matches for the tournaments group stage. India had the direct spot in the AFC champions league from 2021 until 2023.

From 1975 until 1991, the administration of the game was in the hands of the Women's Football Federation of India (WFFI), which comes under the Asian Ladies' Football Confederation (ALFC) that had recognition from neither FIFA nor AFC. Indian team earn its first massive international massive success in SAFF competitions, winning the SAFF Women's Championship four times in a row. Additionally, they won two gold medals at South Asian Games.

In August 2022, FIFA announced that “The Bureau of the FIFA Council unanimously decided to suspend the All India Football Federation (AIFF) with immediate effect due to undue influence from third parties, which constitutes a serious violation of the FIFA Statutes.” 11 days later FIFA lifted the suspension imposed on the All India Football Federation (AIFF), that allowed the 2022 FIFA U-17 Women's World Cup to go ahead as planned. Several new competitions including Futsal Club Championship, beach soccer, minifootball, and seven-a-side football leagues were created, as well as creation/revival of national futsal, women's futsal, F7, minifootball, and beach soccer teams.

In a significant morale boost for the I-League clubs, the winners starting with the 2022-23 will be promoted to the top-tier Indian Super League (ISL), and get easier Super Cup entry. Clubs promoted from the I-League will not be required to pay any participation fee, as approved by the AIFF and the AFC, but they must meet Premier One club licensing requirements to become eligible.

As part of the Premier One licensing criteria, a club must comply with a set of guidelines in order to participate in tournaments conducted by the AFC and the AIFF. In addition to maintaining certain sporting, infrastructural, legal and administrative standards, the Premier One licensing criteria covers financial and administrative factors. The All India Football Federation unveiled its strategic roadmap Vision 2047 in early 2023. The long-due roadmap hopes that in the country's centenary year of independence, India will also emerge as a new powerhouse of Asian football. The football governing body also conceded that the women's football ecosystem needed specific solutions to help increase participation and competency, mentioning the need to improve the minimum salary.

The AIFF wants to create a definitive competitive pyramid with a concrete club progression pathway. This is aimed to give every club an opportunity to get promoted all the way to the first division. They are encouraging member associations to create more competitions at the state and district level, with the main objective to attract more youngsters into the sport by giving them an opportunity to reach the top of Indian football pyramid.

The Reliance Foundation Development League, first Indian developmental football league, organised by the Reliance Foundation in technical support with the All India Football Federation was held in Goa from 15 April to 12 May 2022. It has therefore provided valuable replacement for the discontinued Indian Arrows and AIFF Elite Academy. Being U-21 age group competition, it was a continuation of the U-17, U-15, and U-13 AIFF events called Youth League. The Youth League was founded as the I-League U19 in 2008, which was to give youth teams a national league to play in. 16 teams were split into four groups of four. Earlier, B.C. Roy Trophy had been held for players under 19 years of age, between the teams representing state associations. The tournament was instituted by the AIFF in 1962, with the Indian Football Association presenting the trophy in the memory of former West Bengal Chief Minister Bidhan Chandra Roy.

On 13 June 2023, AIFF league committee announced about introducing a new I-League 3, below I-League 2, where champions of State leagues and nominated clubs will play. Federation Cup and Institutional League have also been revived by the federation.
