= India national football team records and statistics =

Records of India national football team

The following is a list of the India national football team's competitive records and statistics.

The India national football team represents India in international football and is controlled by the All India Football Federation. Under the global jurisdiction of FIFA and governed in Asia by the AFC, the team is also part of the South Asian Football Federation. The team, which was once considered one of the best teams in Asia, had its golden era during the 1950s and early 1960s. During this period, under the coaching of Syed Abdul Rahim, India won gold during the 1951 and 1962 Asian Games, won silver medal in 1964 AFC Asia Cup as runners up, while finishing fourth during the 1956 Summer Olympics. India has never participated in the FIFA World Cup, although the team did qualify by default for the 1950 World Cup after all the other nations in their qualification group withdrew. However India withdrew prior to the beginning of the tournament.

India has never participated in a FIFA World Cup. After gaining independence in 1947, India managed to qualify for the World Cup held in 1950. This was due to Myanmar, Indonesia, and the Philippines withdrawing from qualification. However, prior to the start of the tournament, India themselves withdrew due to the expenses required in getting the team to Brazil. Other reasons cited for why India withdrew include FIFA not allowing Indian players to play in the tournament barefoot and the All India Football Federation not considering the World Cup an important tournament compared to the Olympics.

After withdrawing from the 1950 FIFA World Cup, India didn't enter the qualifying rounds of the tournament between 1954 and 1982. Since the 1986 qualifiers, with the exception of the 1990 edition of the tournament, the team started to participate in qualifiers but have yet to qualify for the tournament again.

== Individual records ==
=== Player records ===
As of 6 October 2026
Players in bold are still active with India.

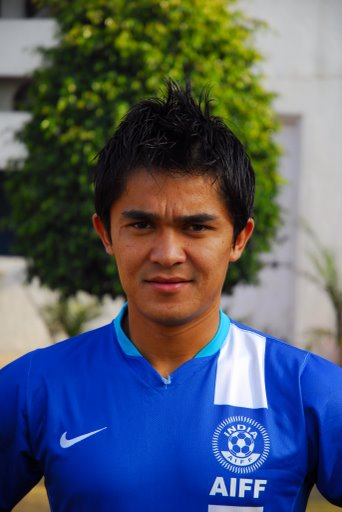
Sunil Chhetri is India's top goalscorer and their most capped player.

Players with most international caps for India
Rank.	Player	Caps	Goals	Career	Ref.
1.	Sunil Chhetri	157	95	2005−2025	
2.	**Gurpreet Singh Sandhu**	91	0	2011−present	
3.	Bhaichung Bhutia	83	27	1995−2011	
4.	**Sandesh Jhingan**	76	6	2015−present	
5.	I. M. Vijayan	74	29 (Note: The old footages of the match shows that Vijayan scored India's second goal in the South Asian Games final against Nepal which ended in a 2–2 draw and is confirmed by AIFF. However RSSSF doesn't include this goal in their statistics..Vijayan is wrongly credited a brace against Hong Kong in 1994 World Cup qualifier by RSSSF but according to FIFA the goal was scored by V. P. Sathyan.)	1991−2003 (Note: Bhutan Football Federation became a member of FIFA only in the year 2000. so, the match against Bhutan at the 1999 South Asian Games is not considered a FIFA 'A' international match by FIFA.)	
6.	Climax Lawrence	72	3	2003−2011	
7.	Gouramangi Singh	71	6	2006−2013	
8.	Shabbir Ali (Note: RSSSF includes the non Full A matches played against Algerian Youth team, South Korean XI and Pakistan XI in their list, but it is excluded here.)	69	16	1974−1984	
9.	Mahesh Gawli	68	1	1999−2011	
9.	Subrata Pal	68	0	2007−2017	

Players with most international goals scored for India
Rank.	Player	Goals	Caps	Ratio	Career
1.	Sunil Chhetri	95 (list)	157	0.61	2005–2025
2.	I. M. Vijayan	29 (list)	74 (Note: The old footages of the match shows that Vijayan scored India's second goal in the South Asian Games final against Nepal which ended in a 2–2 draw and is confirmed by AIFF. However RSSSF doesn't include this goal in their statistics..Vijayan is wrongly credited a brace against Hong Kong in 1994 World Cup qualifier by RSSSF but according to FIFA the goal was scored by V. P. Sathyan.)	0.39	1991−2003 (Note: Bhutan Football Federation became a member of FIFA only in the year 2000. so, the match against Bhutan at the 1999 South Asian Games is not considered a FIFA 'A' international match by FIFA.)
3.	Bhaichung Bhutia	27 (list)	83	0.33	1995−2011
4.	Jeje Lalpekhlua	23 (list)	56	0.41	2011−2019
5.	Shabbir Ali	16 (list)	69 (Note: RSSSF includes the non Full A matches played against Algerian Youth team, South Korean XI and Pakistan XI in their list, but it is excluded here.)	0.23	1974−1984
6.	Magan Singh Rajvi	15 (list)	36 (Note: RSSSF credits the first goal scored by India in their 3–4 defeat to Burma in 1972 Olympic Qualifier to Rajvi. However the News articles credit the goal to Gurdev Singh.)	0.42	1969−1974
6.	P. K. Banerjee	15 (list)	50 (Note: RSSSF includes the matches played against South Korean XI in 1964 and Japan XI in 1965 on their list. But it is considered unofficial by other sources.)	0.3	1955−1966
7.	Chuni Goswami	12 (list)	37	0.32	1958−1964
8.	Tulsidas Balaram	11 (list)	32	0.34	1956−1962 (Note: RSSSF mistakenly includes a goal from the match against Afghanistan and Iran in 1959 and doesn't count the brace Tulsidas scored against Tunisia in a 2–2 draw.)
8.	Mohammed Habib	11 (list)	35	0.31	1969−1974
8.	Jo Paul Ancheri	11 (list)	41	0.27	1994−2004
9.	Neville D'Souza	10 (list)	13 (Note: According to RSSSF Neville played in 1954 Asian Games. But other sources suggests that he was not part of the squad. Hence the goal and matches at the 1954 Games are not included here.)	0.77	1953−1956

=== Manager records ===
- (since 2002)

Manager	Period	Record				
Manager	Period	Matches	Won	Draw	Lost	Win %
(England) Stephen Constantine	2002–05	18	4	5	9	22.22
(India) Sukhwinder Singh	2005	5	1	1	3	20
(India) Syed Nayeemuddin	2005–06	7	4	1	2	57.14
(England) Bob Houghton	2006–11	44	14	6	24	31.82
(India) Armando Colaco	2011 (Interim)	5	0	2	3	0
(India) Savio Medeira	2011–12	13	5	2	6	38.46
(Netherlands) Wim Koevermans	2012–14	20	7	5	8	35
(England) Stephen Constantine	2015–19	42	23	6	13	54.76
(Croatia) Igor Štimac	2019–2024	53	19	14	20	35.85
(Spain) Manolo Márquez	2024–2025	8	1	4	3	12.5
(India) Khalid Jamil	2025–	12	2	4	6	16.67

== Competition records ==
=== FIFA World Cup ===
India has never played in finals of a FIFA World Cup. The closest they came to qualify was back in 2002 when they were a point away from progressing in to the final round.

FIFA World Cup record										FIFA World Cup qualification record					
Year	Result	Position	Pld	W	D	L	GF	GA	Squad	Pld	W	D	L	GF	GA
(Uruguay) 1930	Did not enter									Did not enter					
(Italy) 1934	Did not enter									Did not enter					
(France) 1938	Did not enter									Did not enter					
(Brazil) 1950	Withdrew									Qualified					
(Switzerland) 1954	Denied by FIFA									None					
(Sweden) 1958 to (Spain) 1982	Did not enter									Did not enter					
(Mexico) 1986	Did not qualify									6	2	3	1	7	6
(Italy) 1990	Did not qualify									Withdrew from qualification					
(United States) 1994	Did not qualify									8	1	1	6	8	22
(France) 1998	Did not qualify									3	1	1	1	3	7
(South Korea) (Japan) 2002	Did not qualify									6	3	2	1	11	5
(Germany) 2006	Did not qualify									6	1	1	4	2	18
(South Africa) 2010	Did not qualify									2	0	1	1	3	6
(Brazil) 2014	Did not qualify									2	0	1	1	2	5
(Russia) 2018	Did not qualify									10	2	1	7	7	18
(Qatar) 2022	Did not qualify									8	1	4	3	6	7
(Canada) (Mexico) (United States) 2026	Did not qualify									6	1	2	3	3	7
(Morocco) (Portugal) (Spain) 2030	To be determined														
(Saudi Arabia) 2034	To be determined														
Total	-	-	-	-	-	-	-	-		51	11	15	25	49	94

=== AFC Asian Cup ===
AFC Asian Cup record										AFC Asian Cup record					
Host/Year	Result	Position	Pld	W	D	L	GF	GA	Squad	Pld	W	D	L	GF	GA
(Hong Kong) 1956	Did not enter									Did not enter					
(South Korea) 1960	Did not qualify									6	2	0	4	7	9
(Israel) 1964	Runners-up	2nd	3	2	0	1	5	3	Squad	Bye					
(Iran) 1968	Did not qualify									3	0	1	2	2	6
(Thailand) 1972 to (Kuwait) 1980	Did not enter									Did not enter					
(Singapore) 1984	Group stage	10th	4	0	1	3	0	7	Squad	4	3	0	1	8	2
(Qatar) 1988 to (Indonesia) (Malaysia) (Thailand) (Vietnam) 2007	Did not qualify									21	2	4	15	17	57
(Qatar) 2011	Group stage	16th	3	0	0	3	3	13	Squad	2008 AFC Challenge Cup winners					
(Australia) 2015	Did not qualify									Failed to win 2012 & Did not qualify for 2014 AFC Challenge Cup					
(United Arab Emirates) 2019	Group stage	17th	3	1	0	2	4	4	Squad	18	8	2	8	25	24
(Qatar) 2023	Group stage	24th	3	0	0	3	0	6	Squad	11	4	4	3	14	8
(Saudi Arabia) 2027	To be determined									11	1	4	6	5	12
Totals	Runners-up	5/17	16	3	1	12	12	33		74	20	15	39	78	118

=== Summer Olympics ===
Summer Olympics record										Summer Olympics qualification record					
Host/Year	Result	Position	Pld	W	D	L	GF	GA	Squad	Pld	W	D	L	GF	GA
(United Kingdom) 1908– (Germany) 1936	Did not enter									Did not enter					
(United Kingdom) 1948	Round 1	11th	1	0	0	1	1	2	Squad	Qualified automatically					
(Finland) 1952	Preliminaries	25th	1	0	0	1	1	10	Squad	Qualified automatically					
(Australia) 1956	Semi-finals	4th	3	1	0	2	5	9	Squad	Bye					
(Italy) 1960	Round 1	13th	3	0	1	2	3	6	Squad	4	4	0	0	13	4
(Japan) 1964– (South Korea) 1988	Did not qualify									23	9	1	13	32	38
Total	Semi-finals	4 / 17	8	1	1	6	10	27		23	9	1	13	45	42

=== Asian Games ===
Asian Games record
Host/Year	Result	Position	Pld	W	D	L	GF	GA	Squad
(India) 1951	Champions	1st	3	3	0	0	7	0	Squad
(Philippines) 1954	Round 1	8th	2	1	0	1	3	6	Squad
(Japan) 1958	Semi-finals	4th	5	2	0	3	12	13	Squad
(Indonesia) 1962	Champions	1st	5	4	0	1	11	6	Squad
(Thailand) 1966	Round 1	8th	3	1	0	2	4	7	Squad
(Thailand) 1970	Third place	3rd	6	3	1	2	8	5	Squad
(Iran) 1974	Round 1	13th	3	0	0	3	2	14	Squad
(Thailand) 1978	Round 2	8th	5	1	0	4	5	13	Squad
(India) 1982	Quarter-finals	6th	4	2	1	1	5	3	Squad
(South Korea) 1986	Round 1	16th	3	0	0	3	1	8	Squad
(China) 1990	Did not enter								
(Japan) 1994	Did not enter								
(Thailand) 1998	Round 2	16th	5	1	0	4	3	8	Squad
Total	2 Titles	11 / 13	44	18	2	24	61	83	

=== AFC Challenge Cup ===
AFC Challenge Cup record										AFC Challenge Cup Qualification record					
Host/Year	Result	Position	Pld	W	D	L	GF	GA	Squad	Pld	W	D	L	GF	GA
(Bangladesh) 2006	Quarter-final (Note: India actually played with U-20 team so the matches involving them are not considered as full-A internationals.)	8	4	1	2	1	3	4	Squad	Qualified automatically					
(India) 2008	Champions	1st	5	4	1	0	9	3	Squad	Qualified as hosts					
(Sri Lanka) 2010	Group Stage (Note: India actually played with U-23 team so the matches involving them are not considered as full-A internationals.)	8	3	0	0	3	1	6	Squad	Qualified automatically					
(Nepal) 2012	Group stage	8th	3	0	0	3	0	8	Squad	3	2	1	0	7	2
(Maldives) 2014	Did not qualify									3	2	0	1	6	2
Totals (Note: Only full-A internationals are considered.)	1 Title	2/5	8	4	1	3	9	11		6	4	1	1	13	4

=== SAFF Championship ===
SAFF Championship record
Host/Year	Result	Position	Pld	W	D	L	GF	GA
(Pakistan) 1993	Champions	1st	3	2	1	0	4	1
(Sri Lanka) 1995	Runners-up	2nd	3	0	2	1	2	3
(Nepal) 1997	Champions	1st	4	3	1	0	12	3
(India) 1999	Champions	1st	4	3	1	0	6	1
(Bangladesh) 2003	Third place	3rd	5	2	1	2	8	5
(Pakistan) 2005	Champions	1st	5	4	1	0	9	2
(Maldives) (Sri Lanka) 2008	Runners-up	2nd	5	4	0	1	9	3
(India) 2011	Champions	1st	5	4	1	0	16	2
(Nepal) 2013	Runners-up	2nd	5	2	1	2	4	5
(India) 2015	Champions	1st	4	4	0	0	11	4
(Bangladesh) 2018	Runners-up	2nd	4	3	0	1	8	3
(Maldives) 2021	Champions	1st	5	3	2	0	8	2
(India) 2023	Champions	1st	5	2	3	0	8	2
Total	8 Titles	13/13	57	36	14	7	105	36

=== CAFA Nations Cup ===
CAFA Nations Cup record
Host/Year	Result	Position	Pld	W	D	L	GF	GA
(Tajikistan) (Uzbekistan) 2025	Third place	3rd	4	1	2	1	3	5
Total	Third place	1/1	4	1	2	1	3	5

=== South Asian Games ===
South Asian Games record
Host/Year	Result	Position	Pld	W	D	L	GF	GA
(Nepal) 1984	Did not enter							
(Bangladesh) 1985	Champions (Note: The match against Bhutan is not considered as full-A international.)	1st	3	2	1	0	6	1
(India) 1987	Champions	1st	3	2	1	0	6	0
(Pakistan) 1989	Third place	3rd	3	2	1	0	5	3
(Sri Lanka) 1991	Group stage	6th	2	0	1	1	1	2
(Bangladesh) 1993	Runners-up	2nd	3	1	2	0	6	4
(India) 1995	Champions	1st	3	3	0	0	5	0
(Nepal) 1999	Third place (Note: The match against Bhutan is not considered as full-A international.)	3rd	5	4	0	1	15	4
Totals (Note: Only full-A internationals are considered.)	3 Titles	7/8	20	12	6	2	38	14

=== Other tournaments ===
- Asian Quadrangular Football Tournament
  - (gold) Champions (4): 1952, 1953, 1954, 1955
- Merdeka Cup
  - (silver) Runners-up (2): 1959, 1964
  - (bronze) Third place (4): 1965, 1966, 1970, 2023
- Pesta Sukan Cup
  - (gold) Champions (1): 1971
- Afghanistan Republic Day Cup
  - (bronze) Third place (2): 1976, 1977
- King's Cup
  - (bronze) Third place (2): 1977, 2019
- ANFA Cup
  - (silver) Runners-up (1): 1983
- Afro-Asian Games
  - (silver) Runners-up (1): 2003
- Nehru Cup
  - (gold) Champions (3): 2007, 2009, 2012
- Intercontinental Cup
  - (gold) Champions (2): 2018, 2023
- Tri-Nation Series
  - (gold) Champions (2): 2017, 2023
- VFF Cup
  - (silver) Runners-up (1): 2022

== Head-to-head record ==
Updated as of India vs. Uruguay on 6 october 2026. Only FIFA International “A” Matches counted.

Positive Record Neutral Record Negative Record

Source: FIFA Data Centre: India
Opponent	Played	Won	Drawn	Lost	Goals for	Goals against	Goal difference	% Won	Confederation	Last Match
Afghanistan	14	6	6	2	21	10	+11	42.86%	AFC	2025
Argentina	1	0	0	1	0	1	-1	0%	CONMEBOL	1984
Australia	8	2	1	5	23	25	-2	25%	AFC	2023
Azerbaijan	1	0	0	1	0	3	-3	0%	UEFA	2012
Bahrain	7	0	1	6	4	16	-12	0%	AFC	2022
Bangladesh	29	12	13	4	38	21	+17	41.38%	AFC	2025
Belarus	1	0	0	1	0	3	-3	0%	UEFA	2022
Bhutan	3	3	0	0	10	1	+9	100%	AFC	2011
Brazil	1	0	0	1	0	4	-4	0%	CONMEBOL	2026
Brunei	2	2	0	0	6	0	+6	100%	AFC	2001
Cambodia	5	4	0	1	16	5	+11	80%	AFC	2022
Cameroon	4	0	3	1	5	6	-1	0%	CAF	2012
China	11	0	5	6	6	17	-11	0%	AFC	2018
Chinese Taipei	9	5	2	2	18	12	+6	55.56%	AFC	2018
Curaçao	1	0	0	1	1	3	-2	0%	CONCACAF	2019
Fiji	2	0	0	2	1	3	-2	0%	OFC	2005
Finland	2	0	1	1	0	2	-2	0%	UEFA	1993
France	1	0	0	1	1	2	-1	0%	UEFA	1948
Ghana	1	0	0	1	0	1	-1	0%	CAF	1982
Guam	3	2	0	1	6	2	+4	66.67%	AFC	2015
Guyana	1	0	0	1	1	2	-1	0%	CONCACAF	2011
Hong Kong	18	9	4	5	38	22	+16	50%	AFC	2026
Hungary	1	0	0	1	1	2	-1	0%	UEFA	1991
Iceland	1	0	0	1	0	3	-3	0%	UEFA	2001
Indonesia	17	6	3	8	21	31	-10	35.29%	AFC	2004
Iran	9	2	1	6	6	20	-14	22.22%	AFC	2025
Iraq	7	0	3	4	4	13	-9	0%	AFC	2023
Israel	3	0	0	3	2	7	-5	0%	UEFA	1964
Jamaica	3	0	1	2	0	5	-5	0%	CONCACAF	2026
Japan	12	3	0	9	11	36	-25	25%	AFC	2006
Jordan	2	0	0	2	1	4	-3	0%	AFC	2022
Kenya	2	2	0	0	5	0	+5	100%	CAF	2018
Kuwait	7	2	3	2	8	19	-11	28.57%	AFC	2024
Kyrgyzstan	5	4	0	1	9	3	+6	80%	AFC	2023
Laos	2	2	0	0	7	1	+6	100%	AFC	2016
Lebanon	8	0	4	4	6	12	-6	0%	AFC	2023
Macau	2	2	0	0	6	1	+5	100%	AFC	2017
Malaysia	25	8	7	10	36	48	-12	32%	AFC	2024
Maldives	18	13	2	3	39	14	+25	72.22%	AFC	2025
Mauritius	2	1	1	0	2	1	+1	50%	CAF	2024
Mongolia	1	1	0	0	2	0	+2	100%	AFC	2023
Morocco	1	0	0	1	0	1	-1	0%	CAF	1985
Myanmar	21	10	3	8	30	39	-9	47.62%	AFC	2023
Namibia	1	1	0	0	2	0	+2	100%	CAF	2010
Nepal	23	17	5	1	42	9	+33	73.91%	AFC	2023
New Zealand	2	0	1	1	1	2	-1	0%	OFC	2018
North Korea	7	0	1	6	5	21	-16	0%	AFC	2019
Oman	10	0	3	7	6	23	-17	0%	AFC	2021
Pakistan	25	16	7	2	42	18	+22	64%	AFC	2026
Palestine	2	0	0	2	4	7	-3	0%	AFC	2014
Panama	1	0	1	0	1	1	0	0%	CONCACAF	2026
Peru	1	0	0	1	0	1	-1	0%	CONMEBOL	1986
Philippines	4	2	1	1	8	4	+4	50%	AFC	2013
Poland	1	0	0	1	1	2	-1	0%	UEFA	1984
Puerto Rico	1	1	0	0	4	1	+3	100%	CONCACAF	2016
Qatar	5	0	1	4	1	12	-11	0%	AFC	2024
Saint Kitts and Nevis	1	0	1	0	1	1	+0	0%	CONCACAF	2017
Saudi Arabia	3	0	0	3	1	11	-10	0%	AFC	2006
Singapore	14	4	3	7	14	19	-5	28.57%	AFC	2025
South Korea	19	4	1	14	12	47	-35	21.05%	AFC	2011
South Vietnam	12	7	3	2	19	12	+7	58.33%	AFC	1973
Soviet Union	2	0	0	2	1	16	-15	0%	UEFA	1971
Sri Lanka	15	9	4	2	24	9	+13	60%	AFC	2021
Suriname	2	0	0	2	3	10	-7	0%	CONCACAF	1984
Syria	8	2	2	4	7	11	-4	25%	AFC	2024
Tajikistan	8	2	2	4	11	16	-5	25%	AFC	2026
Thailand	24	7	6	11	28	37	-9	29.17%	AFC	2025
Trinidad and Tobago	4	1	0	3	3	10	-7	25%	CONCACAF	2011
Turkmenistan	5	1	1	3	7	9	-2	20%	AFC	2016
United Arab Emirates	13	2	1	10	7	32	-25	15.38%	AFC	2021
Uruguay	2	0	0	2	2	9	-7	0%	CONMEBOL	2026
Uzbekistan	6	0	1	5	3	14	-11	0%	AFC	2024
Vanuatu	1	1	0	0	1	0	+1	100%	OFC	2023
Vietnam	4	1	1	2	5	7	-2	25%	AFC	2024
Yemen	9	1	2	6	12	20	-8	11.11%	AFC	2010
Zambia	1	0	0	1	0	5	-5	0%	CAF	2011
Zimbabwe	1	0	0	1	0	1	-1	0%	CAF	2026
Total	516	184	113	219	680	822	−142	35.66	FIFA	

== Other records ==
- Longest unbeaten streak: 13 games (2 June 2016 – 14 November 2017)
- Longest winning streak: 8 games (2 June 2016 – 19 August 2017)
- Biggest win: Sri Lanka 0–7 India (7 December 1963)
- Biggest defeat: Soviet Union 11–1 India (15 July 1952)

== Honours ==
Event	Gold	Silver	Bronze	Total
AFC Asian Cup	0	1	0	1
Asian Games	2	0	1	3
Afro-Asian Games	0	1	0	1
AFC Challenge Cup	1	0	0	1
CAFA Nations Cup	0	0	1	1
SAFF Championship	8	4	1	13
South Asian Games	3	1	2	6
Colombo Cup	4	0	0	4
Nehru Cup	3	0	0	3
Intercontinental Cup	2	0	0	2
Tri-Nation Series	2	0	0	2
Pesta Sukan Cup	1	0	0	1
Merdeka Tournament	0	2	4	6
ANFA Cup	0	1	0	1
VFF Cup	0	1	0	1
Afghanistan Republic Day Festival Cup	0	0	2	2
King's Cup	0	0	2	2
Total	26	11	13	50

== See also ==
- India national football team
- India national football team results
- List of India national football team hat-tricks
