= India national football team results =

Football results

Opponents the India men's national football team has played against. India played 2 matches against Soviet Union (last in 1971) but that has not been shown in the map as the country doesn't exist anymore.

The following represents the recent as well as the past results of the India national football team.

== Summary ==
Games played	Won	Draw	Lost	Win %	FIFA Rankings	
Games played	Won	Draw	Lost	Win %	Best	Worst
553	195	118	240	35.26%	94 (1996)	173 (2015)
Biggest win
Sri Lanka 0–7 India 7 December 1963
Biggest defeat
Soviet Union 11–1 India 16 September 1955
Updated as of 15 November 2026 (vs New Zealand).

=== Result by confederation ===
Confederation	Pld	W	D	L	GF	GA	GD	Win %	First meeting	Last meeting
AFC	493	188	107	198	697	753	−56	38.13	1938	2026
CAF	14	4	5	5	16	17	−1	28.57	1960	2026
CONCACAF	14	2	3	9	14	33	−19	15.38	1984	2026
CONMEBOL	6	0	0	6	3	18	−15	0	1960	2026
OFC	7	1	1	5	3	13	−10	14.29	2005	2026
UEFA	19	0	2	17	10	61	−51	0	1948	2022
FIFA	553	195	118	240	743	895	−152	35.26	1938	2026

== See also ==
- Results
  - Women's national team
- List of India national football team hat-tricks
- India national football team records and statistics
- History of the India's FIFA World Rankings
- India's head-to-head record
