= India national football team results (1960–1969) =

Results of India national football team from 1960–1969.

Summary Matches 48–103
Games	Won	Draw	Lost	GF	GA	Win %
56	24	10	22	87	76	42.86%
Biggest win
Sri Lanka 0–7 India 7 December 1963
Biggest defeat
India 0–6 Burma 1 November 1969
Honours
(gold) 1962 Asian Games, Indonesia
(silver) 1964 AFC Asian Cup, Israel
← 1938–59				1970–79 →		

Key
Indicates India national football team won the match
Indicates the match ended in draw
Indicates India national football team lost the match

== 1960 ==
14 April 1960 (Note: In 1999 FIFA deleted Olympics and Olympics Qualifying matches from 1960 to 1988 from its senior 'A' records and only keeping matches from 1908 to 1956 as full 'A' international fixtures. However most FAs ignore FIFA ruling and continue to recognize their Olympics and Olympics qualifying matches as official. According to RSSSF all those matches are considered official for AIFF.)
1960 Olympics Qualifier

India	4−2	Indonesia
Sundararaj 10', 63'; Kannan 21'; Balaram 73'	Report	Omo Suratmo 9'; Henkie Timisela 84'

Calcutta, India

30 April 1960
1960 Olympics Qualifier

Indonesia	0−2	India
	Report	Goswami 78'; Sundararaj 87'

Jakarta, Indonesia
Referee: Oei Poh Hwa (Malaysia)

21 August 1960
International Friendly

Tunisia	2–2	India
Ezzedine 15'; Meddeb 73'	Report	Balaram

Rome, Italy
Attendance: 2,500

26 August 1960
21:00
1960 Olympics

Hungary	2–1	India
Göröcs 23'; Albert 56'	FIFA	Balaram 79'

Stadio Tommaso Fattori, L'Aquila, Italy
Attendance: 4,118
Referee: Bahri Ben Said (Tunisia)

29 August 1960
21:00
1960 Olympics

France	1–1	India
G. Coinçon 82'	Report	Banerjee 71'

Stadio Olimpico Comunale, Grosseto, Italy
Attendance: 907
Referee: Raymond Morgan (Canada)

1 September 1960
21:00
1960 Olympics

Peru	3–1	India
N. Nieri 27', 53'; T. Iwasaki 85'	Report	Balaram 88'

Pescara Adriatic Stadium, Pescara, Italy
Attendance: 1,673
Referee: Mahmoud Hussein Imam (Egypt)

== 1961 ==
3 August 1961
1961 Merdeka Cup

South Vietnam	2–1	India
Do Tho Vinh 58'; Ron Ly Van 76'	Report	Y. Khan 37'

Stadium Merdeka, Kuala Lumpur, Malaya
Referee: H. Angullia (Singapore)

6 August 1961
1961 Merdeka Cup

Japan	3–1	India
Miyamoto 56', 71'; Watanabe 65'	Report	Y. Khan 21'

Stadium Merdeka, Kuala Lumpur, Malaya
Referee: M. Prung (Indonesia)

9 August 1961
1961 Merdeka Cup

Malaya	1–2	India
Minhat 2'	Report	Banerjee 39'; Samajpati 74'

Stadium Merdeka, Kuala Lumpur, Malaya
Attendance: 20,000
Referee: H. Wensveen (Indonesia)

== 1962 ==
26 August 1962
1962 Asian Games

South Korea	2–0	India
Chung Soon-Choon 30'; Cha Tae-Sung 80'	KFA

Senayan Stadium, Jakarta, Indonesia

28 August 1962
1962 Asian Games

Thailand	1–4	India
	Report	Banerjee; Goswami; Balaram

Senayan Stadium, Jakarta, Indonesia

29 August 1962
1962 Asian Games

India	2–0	Japan
Banerjee 53'; Balaram 70'	Report

Senayan Stadium, Jakarta, Indonesia
Referee: Tan Pok Nukuzin (South Vietnam)

1 September 1962
1962 Asian Games

India	3–2	South Vietnam
Goswami 13', 75'; J. Singh 41'	Report	Phan Duong Cam 52' (pen.); Do Thoi Vinh 64'

Senayan Stadium, Jakarta, Indonesia

4 September 1962
1962 Asian Games

India	2–1	South Korea
Banerjee 17'; J. Singh 20'	KFA; AIFF	Cha Tae-sung 85'

Senayan Stadium, Jakarta, Indonesia
Attendance: 110,000

== 1963 ==
27 Nov 1963
1964 Olympic Qualifier

India	5–3	Sri Lanka
Appalaraju; Y. Khan	Report	Mahinda Sirisena

Sugathadasa Stadium, Colombo, Colombo, Sri Lanka

7 Dec 1963
1964 Olympic Qualifier

Sri Lanka	0–7	India
	Report	Appalaraju; Sarmad Khan; I. Singh; Samajpati

Bangalore, India

== 1964 ==
27 May 1964 (Note: The KFA sent its B team to the 1964 AFC Asian Cup, but it recognised the results as international "A" matches.)
AFC Asian Cup

South Korea	0–2	India
	KFA	Appalaraju 2'; I. Singh 57'

Municipal Stadium, Haifa, Haifa, Israel
Attendance: 7,000
Referee: Davoud Nassiri (Iran)

29 May 1964
16:00
AFC Asian Cup

Israel	2–0	India
Spiegler 29' (pen.); Yohai Aharoni 76'	Report

Bloomfield Stadium, Tel Aviv, Tel Aviv, Israel
Attendance: 20,000
Referee: Li Pak Tung (Malaysia)

2 June 1964
16:30
AFC Asian Cup

India	3–1	Hong Kong
I. Singh 45'; Samajpati 60'; Goswami 77'	Report	Cheung Yiu Kwok 39'

Bloomfield Stadium, Tel Aviv, Tel Aviv, Israel
Attendance: 5,000
Referee: Patrick Nice (Malaysia)

6 June 1964
1964 Olympic Qualifier

Iran	3–0	India
Hameed Barmaki; Shirzadegan; Behzadi	Report

Amjadiyeh Stadium, Tehran, Iran
Attendance: 30,000
Referee: Qimaqchi (Iran)

19 June 1964
1964 Olympic Qualifier

India	1–3	Iran
Goswami 11'	Report	Hameed Barmaki 4'; Shirzadegan 10'; Behzadi 88'

Rabindra Sarobar Stadium, Calcutta, India
Attendance: 25,000
Referee: Yohan Mint (Burma)

24 August 1964 (Note: India won on coin toss.)
1964 Merdeka

Malaysia	1–1 (a.e.t.)	India
Mahat Ambu 55'	Report	Sinha 60'

Stadium Merdeka, Kuala Lumpur, Malaysia

27 August 1964
1964 Merdeka

India	4–0	Cambodia
Goswami 5'; D. D'Souza 45', 46'; I. Singh 48'	Report

Stadium Merdeka, Kuala Lumpur, Malaysia
Referee: Patrick Nice (Malaysia)

29 August 1964
1964 Merdeka

Thailand	1–2	India
Aashdang	Report	Asim Moulick; Goswami

Perak Stadium, Ipoh, Malaysia

6 September 1964
1964 Merdeka

India	0–1	Burma
	Report	Ba Pu 60'

Stadium Merdeka, Kuala Lumpur, Malaysia

== 1965 ==
19 August 1965
1965 Merdeka

Hong Kong	2–2	India
Yuen Kuen To 38'; Cheung Yin Kwok 62'	Report	Ashim Moulick 14'; Chatterjee 34'

Perak Stadium, Ipoh, Malaysia

22 August 1965
1965 Merdeka

Malaysia	0–3	India
	Report	Mukherjee 13'; P. V. Jankiram 29'; Samuel Anthony 68'

Perak Stadium, Ipoh, Malaysia
Attendance: 11,500

23 August 1965
19:30
1965 Merdeka

India	0–1	South Korea
	Report	Kim Sam-rak 33'

Stadium Merdeka, Kuala Lumpur, Malaysia
Referee: N. Tantanom (Thailand)

25 August 1965
1965 Merdeka

South Vietnam	0–2	India
	Report	Chatterjee; Mukherjee

Stadium Merdeka, Kuala Lumpur, Malaysia

27 August 1965
1965 Merdeka

Burma	1–1	India
	Report	Chatterjee

Stadium Merdeka, Kuala Lumpur, Malaysia

== 1966 ==
14 August 1966
1966 Merdeka

Hong Kong	0–2	India
	Report	Chatterjee 55'; Rajendra Mohan 75'

Stadium Merdeka, Kuala Lumpur, Malaysia
Attendance: 15,000

22 August 1966
1966 Merdeka

Singapore	1–0	India
Andy Yeo 48'	Report

Stadium Merdeka, Kuala Lumpur, Malaysia

24 August 1966
1966 Merdeka

Taiwan	0–1	India
	Report	I. Arumainayagam

Stadium Merdeka, Kuala Lumpur, Malaysia

26 August 1966
1966 Merdeka

South Vietnam	0–1	India
	Report	I. Arumainayagam

Stadium Merdeka, Kuala Lumpur, Malaysia

28 August 1966
1966 Merdeka

South Korea	0–1	India
	Report	Parimal Dey 29'

Stadium Merdeka, Kuala Lumpur, Malaysia

10 December 1966
1966 Asian Games

Japan	2–1	India
Miyamoto 50', 53'	Report	Chatterjee 48'

Chulalongkorn University Stadium, Bangkok, Bangkok, Thailand
Attendance: 10,000

12 December 1966
1966 Asian Games

India	2–1	Malaysia
I. Singh; J. Singh (pen.)	Report

Chulalongkorn University Stadium, Bangkok, Bangkok, Thailand

13 December 1966
1966 Asian Games

Iran	4–1	India
Esmaeili 20', 85'; Talebi 25'; Jabbari 87'	Report	J. Singh 12' (pen.)

Chulalongkorn University Stadium, Bangkok, Bangkok, Thailand
Attendance: 10,000

== 1967 ==
12 August 1967
1967 Merdeka

Thailand	1–1	India
Preaderm 56'	Report	Habib 59'

Stadium Merdeka, Kuala Lumpur, Malaysia

16 August 1967
1967 Merdeka

India	4–0	Hong Kong
Chatterjee 10'; Gracias 20', 51', 54'	Report

Stadium Merdeka, Kuala Lumpur, Malaysia

19 August 1967
1967 Merdeka

Malaysia	0–0	India
	Report

Stadium Merdeka, Kuala Lumpur, Malaysia

20 August 1967
1967 Merdeka

South Vietnam	1–0	India
Phan Doung Cam	Report

Perak Stadium, Ipoh, Malaysia

22 August 1967 (Note: Taiwan won on unknown tie-breaker.)
1967 Merdeka

Taiwan	1–1 (a.e.t.)	India
Cheung Chi Wai 70'	Report	Inder Singh 25'

Stadium Merdeka, Kuala Lumpur, Malaysia

26 August 1967
1967 Merdeka

Indonesia	3–0	India
Ojong Liza 31'; Soentoro 55'; Bob Permadi 74'	Report

Stadium Merdeka, Kuala Lumpur, Malaysia

13 November 1967
1968 AFC ACQ

Burma	2–0	India
Suk Bahadur 51'; Aung Khin 88'	Report

Bogyoke Aung San Stadium, Rangoon, Burma
Attendance: 30,000

15 November 1967
1968 AFC ACQ

Pakistan	1–1	India
Bakhsh	AIFF	Subramanium

Bogyoke Aung San Stadium, Rangoon, Burma

19 November 1967
1968 AFC ACQ

Cambodia	3–1	India
Sea Chheang Eng 35'; Sieng Tara 57', 60'	Report	Poongam Kannan 89'

Bogyoke Aung San Stadium, Rangoon, Burma

== 1968 ==
11 August 1968
1968 Merdeka

Malaysia	2–1	India
Zulfikili; Thanabalan	Report	Poongam Kannan

Stadium Merdeka, Kuala Lumpur, Malaysia

12 August 1968
1968 Merdeka

India	3–2	South Vietnam
Poongam Kannan 45'; Sadatullah Khan 75', 76'	Report	Quang Kim Phung 16'; Nguyen Van Ngom 26'

Stadium Merdeka, Kuala Lumpur, Malaysia

15 August 1968
1968 Merdeka

India	1–1	Hong Kong
Ashok Chatterjee 67'	Report	Cheng yun Yu 40'

Stadium Merdeka, Kuala Lumpur, Malaysia

17 August 1968
1968 Merdeka

India	3–1	Burma
Sadatullah Khan 58'; Nayeemuddin 65'; Singh 86'	Report	Bahadur 51'

Stadium Merdeka, Kuala Lumpur, Malaysia

19 August 1968
1968 Merdeka

Thailand	1–0	India
Udomslip 37'	Report

Stadium Merdeka, Kuala Lumpur, Malaysia

23 August 1968
1968 Merdeka

South Korea	1–0	India
Kim Ki Bok	Report

Stadium Merdeka, Kuala Lumpur, Malaysia

== 1969 ==
1 November 1969
1969 Merdeka

India	0–6	Burma
	Report	Maung Maung Tin 1'; Ye Nyunt 21', 61', 85'; Hia Tay 25', 33'

Stadium Merdeka, Kuala Lumpur, Malaysia
Referee: F.X Djoereml (Indonesia)

3 November 1969
1969 Merdeka

India	3–0	Singapore
Abdul Latif 29'; Habib 49'; Rajvi 89'	Report

Stadium Merdeka, Kuala Lumpur, Malaysia

8 November 1969
1969 Merdeka

Thailand	1–0	India
	Report

Stadium Merdeka, Kuala Lumpur, Malaysia

== Opponents ==
Team	Pld	W	D	L	GF	GA	GD
Burma	5	1	1	3	5	11	–6
Cambodia	2	1	0	1	5	3	+2
France	1	0	1	0	1	1	0
Hong Kong	5	3	2	0	12	4	+8
Hungary	1	0	0	1	1	2	–1
Indonesia	3	2	0	1	6	5	+1
Iran	3	0	0	3	2	10	–8
Israel	1	0	0	1	0	2	–2
Japan	3	1	0	2	3	5	–2
Malaysia	6	3	2	1	9	5	+4
Pakistan	1	0	1	0	1	1	0
Peru	1	0	0	1	1	3	–2
Singapore	2	1	0	1	3	1	+2
South Korea	6	3	0	3	5	5	0
South Vietnam	6	4	0	2	10	7	+3
Sri Lanka	2	2	0	0	12	3	+9
Taiwan	2	1	1	0	2	1	+1
Thailand	5	2	1	2	7	5	+2
Tunisia	1	0	1	0	2	2	0
Total	56	24	10	22	87	76	+11

== See also ==
- India national football team results (1938–1959)
- India national football team results (1970–1979)
- History of the India national football team
