= India national football team results (2020–present) =

Results of the India national football team in 2020s. Updated as of 15 November 2026 (vs New Zealand).

Summary Matches 487–553
Games	Won	Draw	Lost	GF	GA	Win %
67	19	22	26	64	89	28.36%
Biggest win
India 4–0 Hong Kong 14 June 2022
India 4–0 Pakistan 21 June 2023
Biggest defeat
UAE 6–0 India 29 March 2021
Honours
(gold) 2021 SAFF Championship, Maldives
(gold) 2023 SAFF Championship, India
(bronze) 2025 CAFA Nations Cup, Uzbekistan/Tajikistan
← 2010–19

Key
Indicates India national football team won the match
Indicates the match ended in draw
Indicates India national football team lost the match

== 2021 ==
25 March 2021
17:45 UTC+4:00
Friendly

Oman	1–1	India
A. Singh 43' (o.g.)	Report	M. Singh 55'

Maktoum bin Rashid Al Maktoum Stadium, Dubai, United Arab Emirates
Referee: Omar Mohamed Al Ali (United Arab Emirates)

29 March 2021
19:00 UTC+4:00
Friendly

United Arab Emirates	6–0	India
Mabkhout 12', 32' (pen.), 60'; Ibrahim 64'; de Lima 71'; Tagliabué 84'	Report

Zabeel Stadium, Dubai, United Arab Emirates
Referee: Ilgiz Tantashev (Uzbekistan)

3 June 2021
22:30 IST
2022 AFC WC Q

India	0–1	Qatar
	Report	Hatem 33'

Jassim bin Hamad Stadium, Doha, Qatar
Referee: Ma Ning (China)

7 June 2021
19:30 IST
2022 AFC WC Q

Bangladesh	0–2	India
	Report	Chhetri 79', 90+2'

Jassim bin Hamad Stadium, Doha, Qatar
Attendance: 495
Referee: Zaid Thamer Mohammed (Iraq)

15 June 2021
19:30 IST
2022 AFC WC Q

India	1–1	Afghanistan
Azizi 75' (o.g.)	ESPN	Zamani 82'

Jassim bin Hamad Stadium, Doha, Qatar
Attendance: 603
Referee: Ali Reda (Lebanon)

2 September 2021
17:30 NST
Friendly

Nepal	1–1	India
Bista 36'	Report	Thapa 60'

Dasharath Rangasala, Kathmandu, Nepal
Attendance: 3,604
Referee: Prakash Nath Shrestha (Nepal)

5 September 2021
17:30 NST
Friendly

Nepal	1–2	India
Tamang 87'	Report	Choudhary 62'; Chhetri 80'

Dasharath Rangasala, Kathmandu, Nepal
Attendance: 4,240
Referee: Prajwol Chhetri (Nepal)

4 October 2021
16:00 MVT
SAFF G.S.

Bangladesh	1–1	India
Arafat 74'	Report	Chhetri 26'

National Football Stadium, Malé, Maldives
Referee: Majed Al Shamrani (Saudi Arabia)

7 October 2021
16:00 MVT
SAFF G.S.

India	0–0	Sri Lanka
	ESPN

National Football Stadium, Malé, Maldives
Referee: Sajëçon Zajniddinov (Tajikistan)

10 October 2021
21:00 MVT
SAFF G.S.

Nepal	0–1	India
	AIFF	Chhetri 82'

National Football Stadium, Malé, Maldives
Referee: Yousif Saeed Hassan (Iraq)

13 October 2021
21:00 MVT
SAFF G.S.

India	3–1	Maldives
M. Singh 33'; Chhetri 62', 71'	ESPN	Ashfaq 45' (pen.)

National Football Stadium, Malé, Maldives
Attendance: 5,000
Referee: Ammar Ashkanani (Kuwait)

16 October 2021
20:00 MVT
SAFF Final

India	3–0	Nepal
Chhetri 49'; Wangjam 50'; Samad 90+1'	Report

National Football Stadium, Malé, Maldives
Referee: Majed Al Shamrani (Saudi Arabia)

== 2022 ==
23 March 2022
19:00 UTC+3:00
Friendly

Bahrain	2–1	India
Al-Hardan 37'; Al-Humaidan 88'	ESPN	Bheke 59'

Bahrain National Stadium, Riffa, Bahrain
Attendance: 2,500
Referee: Sadam Omara (Jordan)

26 March 2022
19:00 UTC+3:00
Friendly

India	0–3	Belarus
	UEFA	Bykov 48'; Solovey 68'; Gromyko 90+2'

Bahrain National Stadium, Riffa, Bahrain
Referee: Ismaeel Habib (Bahrain)

28 May 2022
21:00 UTC+3
Friendly

India	0–2	Jordan
	AIFF	Amarah 75'; Zrayq 90+4'

Suheim bin Hamad Stadium, Doha, Qatar
Referee: Qasim Al-Hatmi (Oman)

8 June 2022
20:30 UTC+5:30
AFC ACQ 3R

India	2–0	Cambodia
Chhetri 14' (pen.), 60'	ESPN; AIFF

Salt Lake Stadium, Kolkata, India
Attendance: 26,118
Referee: Baraa Aisha (Palestine)

11 June 2022
20:30 UTC+5:30
AFC ACQ 3R

Afghanistan	1–2	India
Z. Amiri 88'	ESPN	Chhetri 86'; Samad 90+1'

Salt Lake Stadium, Kolkata, India
Attendance: 44,216
Referee: Razlan Joffri Ali (Malaysia)

14 June 2022
20:30 UTC+5:30
AFC ACQ 3R

India	4–0	Hong Kong
A. Ali 1'; Chhetri 45+1'; M. Singh 85'; Pandita 90+3'	ESPN; AIFF

Salt Lake Stadium, Kolkata, India
Attendance: 48,216
Referee: Qasim Al-Hatmi (Oman)

24 September 2022
19:00 UTC+07:00
2022 VFF Tri-Nations Series

India	1–1	Singapore
Kuruniyan 43'	AIFF	I. Fandi 37'

Thong Nhat Stadium, Ho Chi Minh City, Vietnam
Referee: Hoàng Ngọc Hà (Vietnam)

27 September 2022
19:00 UTC+07:00
2022 VFF Tri-Nations Series

Vietnam	3–0	India
Văn Đức 10'; Văn Toàn 49'; Văn Quyết 70'	AIFF

Thong Nhat Stadium, Ho Chi Minh City, Vietnam
Referee: Clifford Daypuyat (Philippines)

== 2023 ==
22 March 2023
18:00 UTC+5:30
2023 Tri-Nation Series

India	1–0	Myanmar
Thapa 45+1'	AIFF

Khuman Lampak Main Stadium, Imphal, India
Attendance: 29,431
Referee: Md Alamgir Sarker (Bangladesh)

28 March 2023
18:00 UTC+5:30
2023 Tri-Nation Series

India	2–0	Kyrgyzstan
Jhingan 34'; Chhetri 84' (pen.)	AIFF

Khuman Lampak Main Stadium, Imphal, India
Attendance: 29,877
Referee: Md Alamgir Sarker (Bangladesh)

9 June 2023
19:30 UTC+5:30
2023 Intercontinental Cup

India	2–0	Mongolia
Samad 2'; Chhangte 14'	AIFF

Kalinga Stadium, India, Bhubaneswar, India
Referee: Songkran Bunmeekiart (Thailand)

12 June 2023
19:30 UTC+5:30
2023 Intercontinental Cup

Vanuatu	0–1	India
	AIFF	Chhetri 81'

Kalinga Stadium, India, Bhubaneswar, India
Referee: Virendha Rai (Bhutan)

15 June 2023
19:30 UTC+5:30
2023 Intercontinental Cup

India	0–0	Lebanon
	AIFF

Kalinga Stadium, Bhubaneswar, India
Referee: Javiz Mohamed (Maldives)

18 June 2023
19:30 UTC+5:30
2023 Intercontinental Cup Final

India	2–0	Lebanon
Chhetri 46'; Chhangte 65'	ESPN

Kalinga Stadium, Bhubaneswar, India
Attendance: 12,600
Referee: Virendha Rai (Bhutan)

21 June 2023
19:30 UTC+5:30
2023 SAFF C'ship

India	4–0	Pakistan
Chhetri 10', 16' (pen.), 74' (pen.); Kumam 81'	SAFF; AIFF

Sree Kanteerava Stadium, Bangalore, India
Attendance: 22,860
Referee: Prajwol Chhetri (Nepal)

24 June 2023
19:30 IST
2023 SAFF C'ship

Nepal	0–2	India
	SAFF	Chhetri 61'; N. M. Singh 70'

Sree Kanteerava Stadium, Bangalore, India
Attendance: 12,642
Referee: Sinan Hussain (Maldives)

27 June 2023
19:30 IST
2023 SAFF C'ship

India	1–1	Kuwait
Chhetri 45+2'	SAFF	A. Ali 90+2' (o.g.)

Sree Kanteerava Stadium, Bangalore, India
Attendance: 9,562
Referee: Md Alamgir Sarker (Bangladesh)

1 July 2023
19:30 IST
2023 SAFF Championship SF

Lebanon	0–0 (a.e.t.)	India
	SAFF
Penalties
Maatouk (penalty missed); Shour (penalty scored); Sadek (penalty scored); Bader (penalty missed)	2–4	(penalty scored) Chhetri; (penalty scored) A. Ali; (penalty scored) N. M. Singh; (penalty scored) Kumam

Sree Kanteerava Stadium, Bangalore, India
Attendance: 19,640
Referee: Sinan Hussain (Maldives)

4 July 2023
19:30 IST
2023 SAFF Championship Final

Kuwait	1–1 (a.e.t.)	India
Khaldi 14'	SAFF	Chhangte 36'
Penalties
Daham (penalty missed); Al Otaibi (penalty scored); Al Dhefiri (penalty scored); Naji (penalty scored); Al Khaldi (penalty scored); El Ebrahim (penalty missed)	4–5	(penalty scored) Chhetri; (penalty scored) Jhingan; (penalty scored) Chhangte; (penalty missed) Kumam; (penalty scored) Bose; (penalty scored) N. M. Singh

Sree Kanteerava Stadium, Bangalore, India
Attendance: 26,380
Referee: Prajwol Chhetri (Nepal)

7 September 2023
16:00 UTC+5:30
2023 King's Cup SF

Iraq	2–2	India
Al-Hamadi 28' (pen.); Hussein 80' (pen.)	AIFF	N. M. Singh 16'; Hassan 51' (o.g.)
Penalties
Doski (penalty scored); Kadhim (penalty scored); Al-Saedi (penalty scored); Al-Hamawi (penalty scored); Resan (penalty scored)	5–4	(penalty missed) Fernandes; (penalty scored) Jhingan; (penalty scored) Wangjam; (penalty scored) A. Ali; (penalty scored) R. Ali

700th Anniversary Stadium, Chiang Mai, Thailand
Referee: Wiwat Jumpaoon (Thailand)

10 September 2023
16:00 UTC+5:30
2023 King's Cup

Lebanon	1–0	India
Kassem 77'	ESPN

700th Anniversary Stadium, Chiang Mai, Thailand
Attendance: 13,567
Referee: Torphong Somsingha (Thailand)

13 October 2023
18:30 UTC+5:30
2023 Merdeka Tournament SF

Malaysia	4–2	India
Cools 7'; Hanapi 20' (pen.); Halim 42'; Corbin-Ong 61'	ESPN	N. M. Singh 13'; Chhetri 51'

Bukit Jalil National Stadium, Kuala Lumpur, Malaysia
Attendance: 46,150
Referee: Mongkolchai Pechhri (Thailand)

16 November 2023
19:30 UTC+3
2026 WCQ / 2027 ACQ

Kuwait	0–1	India
	Report	Manvir 75'

Jaber Al-Ahmad International Stadium, Kuwait City, Kuwait
Attendance: 32,786
Referee: Shaun Evans (Australia)

21 November 2023
19:00 UTC+5:30
2026 WCQ / 2027 ACQ

India	0–3	Qatar
	Report	Meshaal 4'; Ali 47'; Abdurisag 86'

Kalinga Stadium, Bhubaneswar, India
Attendance: 11,389
Referee: Sivakorn Pu-udom (Thailand)

== 2024 ==
13 January 2024
14:30 UTC+3
2023 AAC GS

Australia	2–0	India
Irvine 50'; Bos 73'	ESPN

Ahmad bin Ali Stadium, Al Rayyan, Qatar
Attendance: 35,253
Referee: Yoshimi Yamashita (Japan)

18 January 2024
17:30 UTC+3
2023 AFC Asian Cup GS

India	0–3	Uzbekistan
	ESPN	Fayzullaev 4'; Sergeev 18'; Nasrullev 45+4'

Ahmad bin Ali Stadium, Al Rayyan, Qatar
Attendance: 38,491
Referee: Fu Ming (China)

23 January 2024
14:30 UTC+3
2023 AAC GS

Syria	1–0	India
Khribin 76'	ESPN

Al Bayt Stadium, Al Khor, Qatar
Attendance: 42,787
Referee: Sivakorn Pu-udom (Thailand)

21 March 2024
22:00 UTC+3
2026 WCQ / 2027 ACQ

Afghanistan	0–0	India
	Report

Prince Sultan bin Abdulaziz Sports City, Abha, Saudi Arabia (Note: Afghanistan will play their home matches at a neutral venue due to the ongoing Afghan conflict.)
Attendance: 3,900
Referee: Kim Hee-gon (South Korea)

26 March 2024
19:00 UTC+5:30
2026 WCQ / 2027 ACQ

India	1–2	Afghanistan
Chhetri 38' (pen.)	Report	Akbari 70'; Mukhammad 88' (pen.)

Indira Gandhi Athletic Stadium, Guwahati, India
Attendance: 8,932
Referee: Mohammed Al-Hoish (Saudi Arabia)

6 June 2024
19:00 UTC+5:30
2026 WCQ / 2027 ACQ

India	0–0	Kuwait
	Report

Salt Lake Stadium, Kolkata, India
Attendance: 58,932
Referee: Fu Ming (China)

11 June 2024
18:45 UTC+3
2026 WCQ / 2027 ACQ

Qatar	2–1	India
Yousef Aymen 73'; Al-Rawi 90'	Report	Chhangte 37'

Jassim bin Hamad Stadium, Doha, Qatar
Attendance: 2,816
Referee: Kim Woosung (South Korea)

3 September 2024
19:30 UTC+5:30
2024 Intercontinental Cup

India	0–0	Mauritius
	AIFF

G. M. C. Balayogi Athletic Stadium, Hyderabad, India
Attendance: 18,976
Referee: Mohamed Javiz (Maldives)

9 September 2024
19:30 UTC+5:30
2024 Intercontinental Cup

India	0–3	Syria
	AIFF	Al Aswad 7'; Irandust 76'; Sabbag 90+6'

G. M. C. Balayogi Athletic Stadium, Hyderabad, India
Attendance: 19,982
Referee: Nivon Robesh (Sri Lanka)

12 October 2024
18:00 UTC+7
Friendly

Vietnam	1–1	India
Bùi Vĩ Hào 38'	AIFF	Choudhary 53'

Thiên Trường Stadium, Nam Dinh, Vietnam
Attendance: 8,239
Referee: Choi Hyunjai (South Korea)

18 November 2024
19:30 UTC+5:30
Friendly

India	1–1	Malaysia
Bheke 39'	AIFF	Josué 19'

G. M. C. Balayogi Athletic Stadium, Hyderabad, India
Attendance: 15,367
Referee: Thoriq Munir Alkatiri (Indonesia)

== 2025 ==
19 March 2025
19:00 UTC+5:30
Friendly

India	3–0	Maldives
Bheke 34'; Colaco 66'; Chhetri 76'	AIFF

JLN Stadium, Shillong, India
Attendance: 6,798
Referee: Prajwol Chhetri (Nepal)

25 March 2025
19:00 UTC+5:30
2027 AFC Asian Cup qualification – third round

India	0–0	Bangladesh
	AIFF

JLN Stadium, Shillong, India
Attendance: 14,952
Referee: Hussein Abo Yehia (Lebanon)

4 June 2025
20:00 UTC+7
Friendly

Thailand	2–0	India
Davis 8'; Poramet 59'	AIFF

Thammasat Stadium, Pathum Thani, Thailand
Attendance: 5,045
Referee: Ping Wun Tam (Hong Kong)

10 June 2025
20:00 UTC+8
2027 AFC Asian Cup qualification – third round

Hong Kong	1–0	India
Pereira 90+4' (pen.)	AIFF

Kai Tak Stadium, Kowloon, Hong Kong
Attendance: 42,570
Referee: Ahmad Alaeddin (Lebanon)

29 August 2025
20:30 UTC+5
2025 CAFA Nations Cup

Tajikistan	1–2	India
Samiev 23'	AIFF	A. Ali 5'; Jhingan 13'

Hisor Central Stadium, Hisor, Tajikistan
Attendance: 17,450
Referee: Firdavs Norsafarov (Uzbekistan)

1 September 2025
17:00 UTC+5
2025 CAFA Nations Cup

India	0–3	Iran
	AIFF	Hosseinzadeh 59'; Alipour 89'; Taremi 90+6'

Hisor Central Stadium, Hisor, Tajikistan
Attendance: 1,050
Referee: Ilgiz Tantashev (Uzbekistan)

4 September 2025
17:00 UTC+5
2025 CAFA Nations Cup

Afghanistan	0–0	India
	AIFF

Hisor Central Stadium, Hisor, Tajikistan
Attendance: 1,100
Referee: Nurzatbek Abdikadirov (Kyrgyzstan)

8 September 2025
17:00 UTC+5
2025 CAFA Nations Cup 3rd

India	1–1 (a.e.t.)	Oman
Kumam 80'	AIFF	Al-Yahmadi 55'
Penalties
Chhangte (penalty scored); Bheke (penalty scored); A. Ali (penalty missed); Jithin (penalty scored); Kumam (penalty missed)	3–2	(penalty missed) Al-Saadi; (penalty missed) Al-Kaabi; (penalty scored) Thani Al-Rushaidi; (penalty scored) Al-Ghassani; (penalty missed) Al-Yahmadi

Hisor Central Stadium, Hisor, Tajikistan
Referee: Firdavs Norsafarov (Uzbekistan)

9 October 2025
19:30 UTC+5:30
2027 AFC Asian Cup qualification – third round

Singapore	1–1	India
Ikhsan 45+1'	AIFF	R. Ali 90'

National Stadium, Kallang, Singapore
Attendance: 13,232
Referee: Shen Yinhao (China)

14 October 2025
20:30 UTC+8
2027 AFC Asian Cup qualification – third round

India	1–2	Singapore
Chhangte 14'	AIFF	Ui-young 44', 58'

Jawaharlal Nehru Stadium, Margao, India
Attendance: 2,036
Referee: Mohamad Issa (Lebanon)

18 November 2025
20:00 UTC+6
2027 AFC Asian Cup qualification – third round

Bangladesh	1–0	India
Morsalin 11'	AIFF

National Stadium, Dhaka, Bangladesh
Attendance: 23,712
Referee: Clifford Daypuyat (Philippines)

== 2026 ==
31 March 2026
19:00 UTC+5:30
2027 AFC Asian Cup qualification – third round

India	2–1	Hong Kong
Williams 4'; Mishra 50'	AFC; AIFF	Camargo 65'

Jawaharlal Nehru International Stadium, Kochi, India
Attendance: 22,690
Referee: Songkran Bunmeekiart (Thailand)

27 May 2026
19:30 UTC+1
2026 Unity Cup

India	0–2	Jamaica
	AIFF	Clarke 8'; Dixon 78'

The Valley, London, England
Referee: Darren England (England)

30 May 2026
14:30 UTC+1
2026 Unity Cup

Zimbabwe	1–0	India
Dube 34' (pen.)	AIFF

The Valley, London, England
Referee: Andrew Madley (England)

5 June 2026
20:30 UTC+5:30
Friendly

Tajikistan	3–1	India
Boboev 9' (pen.); Karimov 62'; Panjshanbe 68'	AIFF	Choudhary 89'

TALCO Arena, Hisor, Tajikistan
Attendance: 10,245
Referee: Asker Nadjafaliev (Uzbekistan)

9 June 2026
20:30 UTC+5:30
Friendly

Tajikistan	1–1	India
Boboev 85' (pen.)	AIFF	V. P. Singh 25'

TALCO Arena, Hisor, Tajikistan
Attendance: 9,370
Referee: Akhrol Riskulloev (Uzbekistan)

25 September 2026
19:30 UTC+5:30
Friendly

India	1–1	Panama
Williams 41'	AIFF; FIFA	O. Valencia 68'

Sree Kanteerava Stadium, Bengaluru, India
Attendance: 9,039
Referee: Nazmi Nasaruddin (Malaysia)

3 October 2026
19:30 UTC+5:30
Friendly

India	0–4	Brazil
	AIFF; FIFA	Estêvão 28'; Pedro 42'; Lino 58', 90+5'

Salt Lake Stadium, Kolkata, India
Attendance: 51,402
Referee: Ilgiz Tantashev (Uzbekistan)

6 October 2026
19:30 UTC+5:30
Friendly

India	1–6	Uruguay
Thapa 22'	AIFF; FIFA	Núñez 12' (pen.); Araújo 28', 59'; Zalazar 53'; Sanabria 71'; Aguirre 86'

Salt Lake Stadium, Kolkata, India
Attendance: 37,307
Referee: Rustam Lutfullin (Uzbekistan)

12 November 2026
19:00 +13:00
Friendly

New Zealand	5–0	India
Varghese 5' (o.g.); Randall 34', 43'; Wood 57'; Bayliss 75'	AIFF; NZF

Go Media Stadium, Auckland, New Zealand
Attendance: 10,379
Referee: Adam Kersey (Australia)

15 November 2026
16:30 +13:00
Friendly

New Zealand	3–0	India
Surman 22'; McGarry 40'; Wood 44'	AIFF; NZF

One New Zealand Stadium, Christchurch, New Zealand
Referee: Tim Danaskos (Australia)

== Opponents ==
Updated as of 15 November 2026 (vs New Zealand).

Team	Pld	W	D	L	GF	GA	GD
Afghanistan	5	1	3	1	4	4	0
Australia	1	0	0	1	0	2	–2
Bahrain	1	0	0	1	1	2	–1
Bangladesh	4	1	2	1	3	2	+1
Belarus	1	0	0	1	0	3	–3
Brazil	1	0	0	1	0	4	–4
Cambodia	1	1	0	0	2	0	+2
Hong Kong	3	2	0	1	6	2	+4
Iran	1	0	0	1	0	3	–3
Iraq	1	0	1	0	2	2	0
Jamaica	1	0	0	1	0	2	-2
Kuwait	4	1	3	0	3	2	+1
Kyrgyzstan	1	1	0	0	2	0	+2
Lebanon	4	1	2	1	2	1	+1
Malaysia	2	0	1	1	3	5	–2
Maldives	2	2	0	0	6	1	+5
Mauritius	1	0	1	0	0	0	0
Mongolia	1	1	0	0	2	0	+2
Myanmar	1	1	0	0	1	0	+1
Nepal	5	4	1	0	9	2	+7
New Zealand	2	0	0	2	0	8	–8
Oman	2	0	2	0	2	2	0
Panama	1	0	1	0	1	1	0
Pakistan	1	1	0	0	4	0	+4
Qatar	3	0	0	3	1	6	–5
Singapore	3	0	2	1	3	4	–1
Sri Lanka	1	0	1	0	0	0	0
Syria	2	0	0	2	0	4	–4
Tajikistan	3	1	1	1	4	5	–1
Thailand	1	0	0	1	0	2	–2
United Arab Emirates	1	0	0	1	0	6	–6
Uzbekistan	1	0	0	1	0	3	–3
Uruguay	1	0	0	1	1	6	–5
Vanuatu	1	1	0	0	1	0	+1
Vietnam	2	0	1	1	1	4	–3
Zimbabwe	1	0	0	1	0	1	–1
Total	67	19	22	26	64	89	–25

== See also ==
- India women's national football team results (2020–present)
- India national football team results (unofficial matches 2000–present)
- India national football team results (2010–2019)
