= Dheengsari =

Dheengsari Dheengsari
- Village
- Country: India
- State: Rajasthan
- District: Bikaner

Dheengsari is a village in North-West Rajasthan, situated nearby Bikaner. Dheengsari Village is under Panchayat Samiti Panchu, Tehsil Nokha (Rajasthan Assembly constituency) and Bikaner District. It is 60 km from Bikaner and 30 km from Deshnok (Karni Mata Temple). The village is notable for Amar Singhot Rajvi, who established and ruled Bikaner.

Dheengsari is known for its football players, including Arjuna Awardy Former Indian Football team Captain Magan Singh Rajvi & Chain Singh Rajvi.

== Notable people ==
- Magan Singh Rajvi (Indian Football Team Captain & Arjuna award winner)
- Prince Godha - From Dhingsari
