= India women's national football team results =

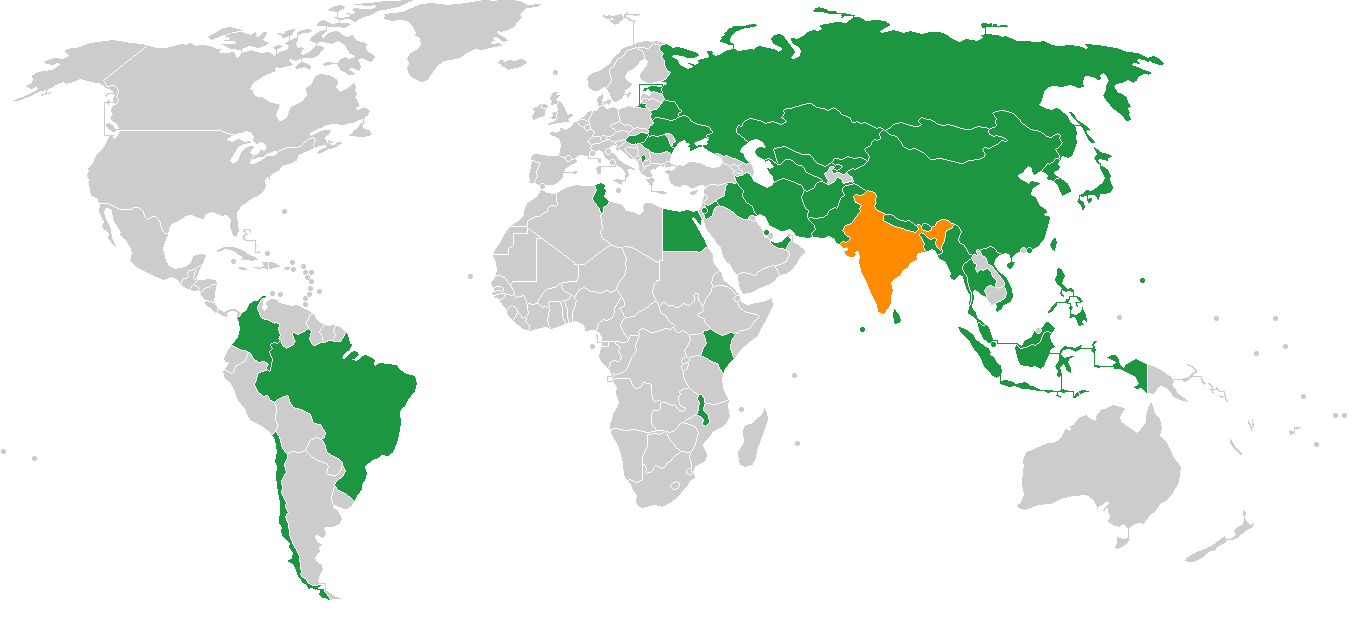
Opponents of India women's national football team, as of April 2026

This article summarizes the outcomes of all matches including FIFA recognised, unofficial and matches played against club teams by the India women's national football team, since they first played in 1975.

== Head-to-head records ==
The following table shows India's all-time official international record per opponent. Updated as of 11 October 2026 (vs Russia)

Positive Record Neutral Record Negative Record

Opponent	Pld	W	D	L	GF	GA	Win %	First match	Most recent match	Confederations
Afghanistan	3	3	0	0	28	1	100	14 September 2012	27 December 2016	AFC
Bangladesh	14	11	1	2	49	11	78.57	6 February 2010	6 June 2026	AFC
Belarus	1	0	0	1	1	2	0	8 April 2021		UEFA
Bahrain	6	5	0	1	14	5	83.33	17 September 2011	10 October 2021	AFC
Bhutan	3	3	0	0	30	0	100	13 December 2010	3 June 2026	AFC
Brazil	1	0	0	1	1	6	0	25 November 2021		CONMEBOL
Chile	2	0	0	2	1	5	0	4 September 1994	28 November 2021	CONMEBOL
China	2	0	0	2	0	28	0	11 December 1998	11 June 2003	AFC
Chinese Taipei	11	1	1	9	6	32	9.09	15 January 1980	10 March 2026	AFC
Egypt	1	1	0	0	1	0	100	5 April 2022		CAF
Estonia	1	1	0	0	4	3	100	21 February 2024		UEFA
Guam	2	2	0	0	20	0	100	9 December 1997	12 June 2005	AFC
Hong Kong	10	9	1	0	21	3	90	12 January 1980	24 February 2024	AFC
Hungary	1	0	0	1	1	8	0	2 September 1994		UEFA
Indonesia	3	3	0	0	7	0	100	27 January 2019	3 April 2019	AFC
Iran	4	2	0	2	5	7	50	20 October 2007	21 October 2025	AFC
Iraq	1	1	0	0	5	0	100	2 July 2025		AFC
Japan	6	1	0	5	1	32	16.67	21 January 1986	7 March 2026	AFC
Jordan	4	2	1	1	4	2	50	8 April 2022	20 February 2025	AFC
Kazakhstan	1	0	1	0	0	0	0	5 March 2019		UEFA
Kenya	1	0	0	1	0	2	0	11 April 2026		CAF
Kosovo	1	0	0	1	0	1	0	27 February 2024		UEFA
Kyrgyzstan	2	2	0	0	9	0	100	4 April 2023	7 April 2023	AFC
Malaysia	5	4	1	0	11	0	80	18 January 1980	31 July 2017	AFC
Malawi	1	1	0	0	3	2	100	15 April 2026		CAF
Maldives	9	8	1	0	79	1	88.89	14 September 2014	25 May 2026	AFC
Mongolia	1	1	0	0	13	0	100	23 June 2025		AFC
Myanmar	7	0	2	5	6	19	0	21 May 2013	12 July 2024	AFC
Nepal	19	11	5	3	40	14	57.89	4 February 2010	27 October 2025	AFC
North Korea	2	0	0	2	0	15	0	7 November 1999	3 April 2017	AFC
Pakistan	4	4	0	0	22	2	100	31 January 2010	17 October 2024	AFC
Palestine	1	0	1	0	1	1	0	25 May 2013		AFC
Philippines	2	2	0	0	13	0	100	10 June 1981	10 April 1983	AFC
Romania	1	0	0	1	0	3	0	3 March 2019		UEFA
Russia	4	0	0	4	0	22	0	19 February 2021	11 October 2026	UEFA
Singapore	2	2	0	0	6	0	100	8 June 1981	15 April 1983	AFC
South Korea	8	0	0	8	0	49	0	27 September 1995	26 February 2025	AFC
Sri Lanka	8	8	0	0	45	1	100	29 January 2010	5 December 2019	AFC
Thailand	8	1	0	7	5	22	12.5	15 June 1981	5 July 2025	AFC
Timor-Leste	1	1	0	0	4	0	100	29 June 2025		AFC
Tunisia	1	0	0	1	0	1	0	5 October 2021		CAF
Turkmenistan	1	1	0	0	10	0	100	1 March 2019		AFC
United Arab Emirates	1	1	0	0	5	0	100	2 October 2021		AFC
Ukraine	1	0	0	1	2	3	0	23 February 2021		UEFA
Uzbekistan	16	1	3	12	13	35	6.25	28 August 1994	3 June 2025	AFC
Venezuela	1	0	0	1	1	2	0	1 December 2021		CONMEBOL
Vietnam	7	0	1	6	5	15	0	13 November 1999	4 March 2026	AFC
Total	192	93	19	80	492	355	48.44	12 January 1980	11 October 2026	FIFA

== See also ==
- India men's national team results
