= India national football team results (1938–1959) =

List of FIFA A matches played by India national team (1938–1959)

Results of India national football team from 1938 to 1959.

Summary Matches 1–47
| Games | Won | Draw | Lost | GF | GA | Win % |
|---|---|---|---|---|---|---|
| 47 | 24 | 6 | 17 | 103 | 97 | 51.06% |
Biggest win
Australia 1–7 India 12 December 1956
Biggest defeat
Soviet Union 11–1 India 16 September 1955
Honours
(gold) 1951 Asian Games, India
1960–69 →

Key
| Indicates India national football team won the match |
| Indicates the match ended in draw |
| Indicates India national football team lost the match |

== 1938 ==
3 September 1938
Friendly

| Australia | 5–3 | India |
|---|---|---|
| Quill; Jack Hughes; Jim Wilkinson | Report | Rahim; Bhattacharya; Lumsden |

Sydney Showground, Sydney, Australia
Attendance: 16,144

10 September 1938
Friendly

| Australia | 4–4 | India |
|---|---|---|
| Jack Hughes; Kitching; Cecil Brittain | Report | Rahim 47'; Bhattacharya 49'; Noor Mohammed; Lumsden |

Brisbane Exhibition Ground, Brisbane, Australia
Attendance: 16,000
Referee: J. Edwards (Australia)

17 September 1938
Friendly

| Australia | 1–4 | India |
|---|---|---|
| Jack Hughes | Report | Rahim; Lumsden 46' (pen.); Bhattacharya |

Newcastle Sports Ground, Newcastle, Australia
Attendance: 9,000

24 September 1938
Friendly

| Australia | 5–4 | India |
|---|---|---|
| Jack Hughes; Jim Wilkinson; Ray Bryant | Report | K Prosad; Lumsden (pen.) |

Sydney Showground, Sydney, Australia
Attendance: 12,000

1 October 1938
Friendly

| Australia | 3–1 | India |
|---|---|---|
| Jack Hughes; Coolahan; McIver | Report | Lumsden |

Melbourne Showground, Melbourne, Australia
Referee: F.R. Thorpe (Australia)

== 1948 ==
31 July 1948 (Note: This match against France is considered as full A international for India by FIFA.. But according to the French Football Federation they fielded amateur players and not the main 'A' national team.)
18:30
1948 Olympics

| France | 2–1 | India |
|---|---|---|
| Courbin 30'; Persillon 89' | FFF; FIFA | Raman 70' |

Cricklefield Stadium, London, UK
Attendance: 17,000
Referee: Gunnar Dahlner (Sweden)

== 1951 ==
4 March 1951
16:15
1951 Asian Games

| India | 3–0 | Indonesia |
|---|---|---|
| Mewalal 27'; Siregar 42' (o.g.); Venkatesh 50' | Report |

National Stadium, New Delhi, India

7 March 1951
16:15
1951 Asian Games

| India | 3–0 | Afghanistan |
|---|---|---|
| Venkatesh 10'; Mewalal 16'; Nandy 55' | Report |

National Stadium, New Delhi, India
Attendance: 15,000

10 March 1951
17:00
1951 Asian Games

| India | 1–0 | Iran |
|---|---|---|
| Mewalal 34' | Report |

National Stadium, New Delhi, India
Attendance: 25,000

== 1952 ==
9 March 1952
1952 Colombo Cup

| Ceylon | 0–3 | India |
|---|---|---|
| | Report | Venkatesh 13', 50'; Mewalal 45' |

Colombo Oval, Colombo, Ceylon
Attendance: 10,000
Referee: Mr. A. Roy (India)

16 March 1952
1952 Colombo Cup

| India | 4–0 | Burma |
|---|---|---|
| Mewalal 20' 25' 35'; Venkatesh 53' | Report |

Colombo Oval, Colombo, Ceylon
Attendance: 12,500
Referee: P. S. Swales (Ceylon)

23 March 1952
1952 Colombo Cup

| India | 0–0 | Pakistan |
|---|---|---|
| | Report |

Colombo Oval, Colombo, Ceylon
Referee: U. Kim Teikh (Burma)

15 July 1952
19:00
1952 Olympics

| Yugoslavia | 10–1 | India |
|---|---|---|
| Vukas 2', 62'; Mitić 14', 43'; Zebec 17', 23', 60', 87'; Ognjanov 52', 67' | FIFA | Khan 89' |

Töölön Pallokenttä, Helsinki, Finland
Attendance: 10,000
Referee: John Best (United States)

== 1953 ==
23 October 1953
1953 Colombo Cup

| India | 1–0 | Pakistan |
|---|---|---|
| D'Souza 59' | Report |

Aung San Stadium, Rangoon, Burma
Referee: U. Kim Teikh (Myanmar)

27 October 1953
1953 Colombo Cup

| India | 2–0 | Ceylon |
|---|---|---|
| Venkatesh; Khan 35' | Report |

Aung San Stadium, Rangoon, Burma
Attendance: 25,000
Referee: Maung May Lay (Myanmar)

31 October 1953
1953 Colombo Cup

| Burma | 2–4 | India |
|---|---|---|
| Samuel; Ba Kyu 60' | Report | Thangaraj 4'; Venkatesh; Khan |

Aung San Stadium, Rangoon, Burma
Referee: Mahmood Shah (Pakistan)

== 1954 ==
3 May 1954
1954 Asian Games

| India | 3–2 | Japan |
|---|---|---|
| Moinuddin 6', 28'; Joe D'Sa 42' | Report | Takabayashi 47'; Kawamoto 78' |

Rizal Memorial Stadium, Manila, Philippines
Referee: Chan Kim Taik (Burma)

5 May 1954
1954 Asian Games

| Indonesia | 4–0 | India |
|---|---|---|
| D. Dhalhar 28' (pen.), 80'; Ramang 51', 69' | Report |

Rizal Memorial Stadium, Manila, Philippines

18 December 1954
1954 Colombo Cup

| India | 1–1 | Ceylon |
|---|---|---|
| Moin 71' | Report | Andrew Fernando 90' |

Calcutta FC Ground, Calcutta, India

23 December 1954
1954 Colombo Cup

| India | 2–1 | Burma |
|---|---|---|
| Thapa 16'; Patrick 44' | Report | Samuel 46' |

Calcutta FC Ground, Calcutta, India

26 December 1954
1954 Colombo Cup

| India | 3–1 | Pakistan |
|---|---|---|
| Thapa 48', 70', 71' | Report | Fakhri 57' |

Calcutta FC Ground, Calcutta, India
Attendance: 100,000
Referee: Mac Hedger (Singapore)

== 1955 ==
16 September 1955 (Note: This match against Soviet Union in 1955 is considered as full A international by FIFA.)
19:00 (UTC+03:00)
Friendly

| Soviet Union | 11–1 | India |
|---|---|---|
| Shabrov 18', 47'; Streltsov 19', 46', 73'; Kuznetsov 32', 85'; Salnikov 60', 63', 74'; Netto 80' | Report | Susanta Ghosh 66' |

Dinamo Stadium, Moskva, Soviet Union
Attendance: 25,000
Referee: Nikolay Latyshev (Soviet Union)

18 December 1955
1955 Colombo Cup

| India | 4–3 | Ceylon |
|---|---|---|
| Banerjee 30'; Mewalal; Sattar | Report | Peter Ranasinghe 2'; Andrew Fernando |

Dacca Stadium, Dacca, East Pakistan

20 December 1955 (Note: Some sources report that the match ended in a score of 2–1.)
1955 Colombo Cup

| India | 5–2 | Burma |
|---|---|---|
| Banerjee; D'Souza; Kempaiah | Report | Suk Bahadur; Aung Shein |

Dacca Stadium, Dacca, East Pakistan

24 December 1955
1955 Colombo Cup

| Pakistan | 1–2 | India |
|---|---|---|
| Fakhri | Report | Banerjee 13'; D'Souza 29' |

Dacca Stadium, Dacca, East Pakistan
Attendance: 50,000

== 1956 ==
17 June 1956
Friendly

| India | 0–1 | China |
|---|---|---|
| | Report | Cong 8' |

Delhi Gate Stadium, New Delhi, India
Attendance: 25,000

1 December 1956
09:00
1956 Olympics

| Australia | 2–4 | India |
|---|---|---|
| Morrow 17', 41' | AIFF | D'Souza 9', 33', 50'; K. Kittu 80' |

Melbourne Cricket Ground, Melbourne, Australia
Attendance: 7,413
Referee: C.H. Wensveen (Indonesia)

4 December 1956
11:00
1956 Olympics

| Yugoslavia | 4–1 | India |
|---|---|---|
| Papec 54', 65'; Veselinović 57'; M. Salam 78' (o.g.) | Report | D'Souza 52' |

Melbourne Cricket Ground, Melbourne, Australia
Attendance: 16,626
Referee: Nikolay Latyshev (Soviet Union)

7 December 1956
08:45
1956 Olympics

| Bulgaria | 3–0 | India |
|---|---|---|
| Diev 37', 60'; Milanov 42' | FIFA |

Melbourne Cricket Ground, Melbourne, Australia
Attendance: 21,236
Referee: Nikolay Latyshev (Soviet Union)

12 December 1956
Friendly

| Australia | 1–7 | India |
|---|---|---|
| Vogler | Report | PK Banerjee; D'Souza; K. Kittu; S. Banerjee |

Sydney Sports Ground, Sydney, Australia
Attendance: 3,000
Referee: Herbert Imlay (Australia)

== 1958 ==
26 May 1958
1958 Asian Games

| India | 3–2 | Burma |
|---|---|---|
| Goswami; Balaram; Damodaran | Report |

Korakuen Velodrome, Tokyo, Japan

28 May 1958
1958 Asian Games

| Indonesia | 2–1 | India |
|---|---|---|
| Tjiang 11' 53' | Report | Rahmatullah 35' |

Tokyo, Japan

30 May 1958
1958 Asian Games

| India | 5–2 (a.e.t.) | Hong Kong |
|---|---|---|
| Rahmatullah; Goswami; Tulsidas Balaram; Damodaran | Report |

Tokyo, Japan

31 May 1958
1958 Asian Games

| South Korea | 3–1 | India |
|---|---|---|
| Choi Chung-min 13'; Lee Soo-nam 75'; Moon Jung-sik 83' | KFA | Damodaran 67' |

National Stadium, Tokyo, Japan

1 June 1958
1958 Asian Games

| Indonesia | 4–1 | India |
|---|---|---|
| Saari 10'; Omo Suratmo 59'; Wowo Sunaryo 60'; Phwa Sian Liong 88' | Report | Balaram 46' (pen.) |

National Stadium, Tokyo, Japan
Attendance: 46,000

== 1959 ==
27 August 1959 (Note: In 1999 FIFA deleted Olympics and Olympics Qualifying matches from 1960 to 1988 from its senior 'A' records and only keeping matches from 1908 to 1956 as full 'A' international fixtures. However most FAs ignore FIFA ruling and continue to recognize their Olympics and Olympics qualifying matches as official. According to RSSSF all those matches are considered official for AIFF.)
1960 Olympics Qualifier

| Afghanistan | 2−5 | India |
|---|---|---|
| Ayubi; Mosa | Report | PK Banerjee; Chuni Goswami; Mariappa Kempiah; Rahmatullah; Moloy Lahiri |

Ghazi Stadium, Kabul, Afghanistan

31 August 1959
1959 Merdeka

| Singapore | 0–2 | India |
|---|---|---|
| | Report | Rahmatullah 52'; Balaram 61' |

Stadium Merdeka, Kuala Lumpur, Malaya
Attendance: 20,000

3 September 1959
1959 Merdeka

| India | 2–0 | Hong Kong |
|---|---|---|
| Zulfiquer 8'; Kannan 79' | Report |

Stadium Merdeka, Kuala Lumpur, Malaya
Attendance: 11,000

4 September 1959
1959 Merdeka

| Malaya | 1–1 | India |
|---|---|---|
| Robert Choe 60' (pen.) | Report | Kannan 63' |

Stadium Merdeka, Kuala Lumpur, Malaya
Attendance: 18,000

6 September 1959
1959 Merdeka

| South Vietnam | 2–2 | India |
|---|---|---|
| Do Thoi Vinh 20', 53' | Report | Zulfiquer 8'; Kannan 56' |

Stadium Merdeka, Kuala Lumpur, Malaya

8 September 1959
Friendly

| South Korea | 1–1 | India |
|---|---|---|
| Cho Yoon-ok 30' | KFA | P. K. Banerjee 6' |

City Stadium, Penang, Malaya
Referee: O. Hussain (Malaya)

7 December 1959
1960 AFC ACQ

| India | 1–0 | Pakistan |
|---|---|---|
| D. D'Souza 35' | Report |

Maharaja College Stadium, Cochin, India
Attendance: 30,000

8 December 1959
1960 AFC ACQ

| India | 1–3 | Israel |
|---|---|---|
| Kittu 70' | Report | Levi 35', 43', 53' |

Maharaja College Stadium, Cochin, India
Attendance: 30,000

11 December 1959
1960 AFC ACQ

| India | 3–1 | Iran |
|---|---|---|
| Goswami 64'; Yousuf Khan 66' (pen.); Bahadur Ram 80' | Report | Dehdari 62' |

Maharaja College Stadium, Cochin, India
Attendance: 20,000
Referee: Masudur Rahman (Pakistan)

13 December 1959
1960 AFC ACQ

| India | 0–1 | Pakistan |
|---|---|---|
| | Report | Abdullah 13' |

Maharaja College Stadium, Cochin, India
Attendance: 30,000

16 December 1959
1960 AFC ACQ

| India | 1–2 | Israel |
|---|---|---|
| Rahmatullah 19' | Report | Stelmach 11'; Levi 75' |

Maharaja College Stadium, Cochin, India
Attendance: 35,000
Referee: Natarajan (Malaysia)

18 December 1959 (Note: The Indian source claims that the goal was scored by Yousuf Khan for India, while the Iranian source credits it to Chuni Goswami.)
1960 AFC ACQ

| India | 1–2 | Iran |
|---|---|---|
| Yousuf Khan 64' | Report | Dehdari |

Maharaja College Stadium, Cochin, India
Attendance: 25,000

== Opponents ==
| Team | Pld | W | D | L | GF | GA | GD |
|---|---|---|---|---|---|---|---|
| Afghanistan | 2 | 2 | 0 | 0 | 8 | 2 | +6 |
| Australia | 7 | 3 | 1 | 3 | 27 | 21 | +6 |
| Bulgaria | 1 | 0 | 0 | 1 | 0 | 3 | −3 |
| Burma | 5 | 5 | 0 | 0 | 18 | 6 | +12 |
| Ceylon | 4 | 3 | 1 | 0 | 10 | 4 | +6 |
| China | 1 | 0 | 0 | 1 | 0 | 1 | –1 |
| France | 1 | 0 | 0 | 1 | 1 | 2 | –2 |
| Hong Kong | 2 | 2 | 0 | 0 | 7 | 2 | +5 |
| Indonesia | 4 | 1 | 0 | 3 | 5 | 10 | −5 |
| Iran | 3 | 2 | 0 | 1 | 5 | 3 | +2 |
| Israel | 2 | 0 | 0 | 2 | 2 | 5 | −3 |
| Japan | 1 | 1 | 0 | 0 | 3 | 2 | +1 |
| Malaya | 1 | 0 | 1 | 0 | 1 | 1 | 0 |
| Pakistan | 6 | 4 | 1 | 1 | 7 | 4 | +3 |
| Singapore | 1 | 1 | 0 | 0 | 2 | 0 | +2 |
| South Korea | 2 | 0 | 1 | 1 | 2 | 4 | −2 |
| South Vietnam | 1 | 0 | 1 | 0 | 2 | 2 | 0 |
| Soviet Union | 1 | 0 | 0 | 1 | 1 | 11 | −10 |
| Yugoslavia | 2 | 0 | 0 | 2 | 2 | 14 | −12 |
| Total | 47 | 24 | 6 | 17 | 103 | 97 | +6 |

== See also ==
- India national football team results (1960–1969)
- History of the India national football team
- India national football team records and statistics
