= Shabbir Ali =

Indian footballer and football manager (born 1986)

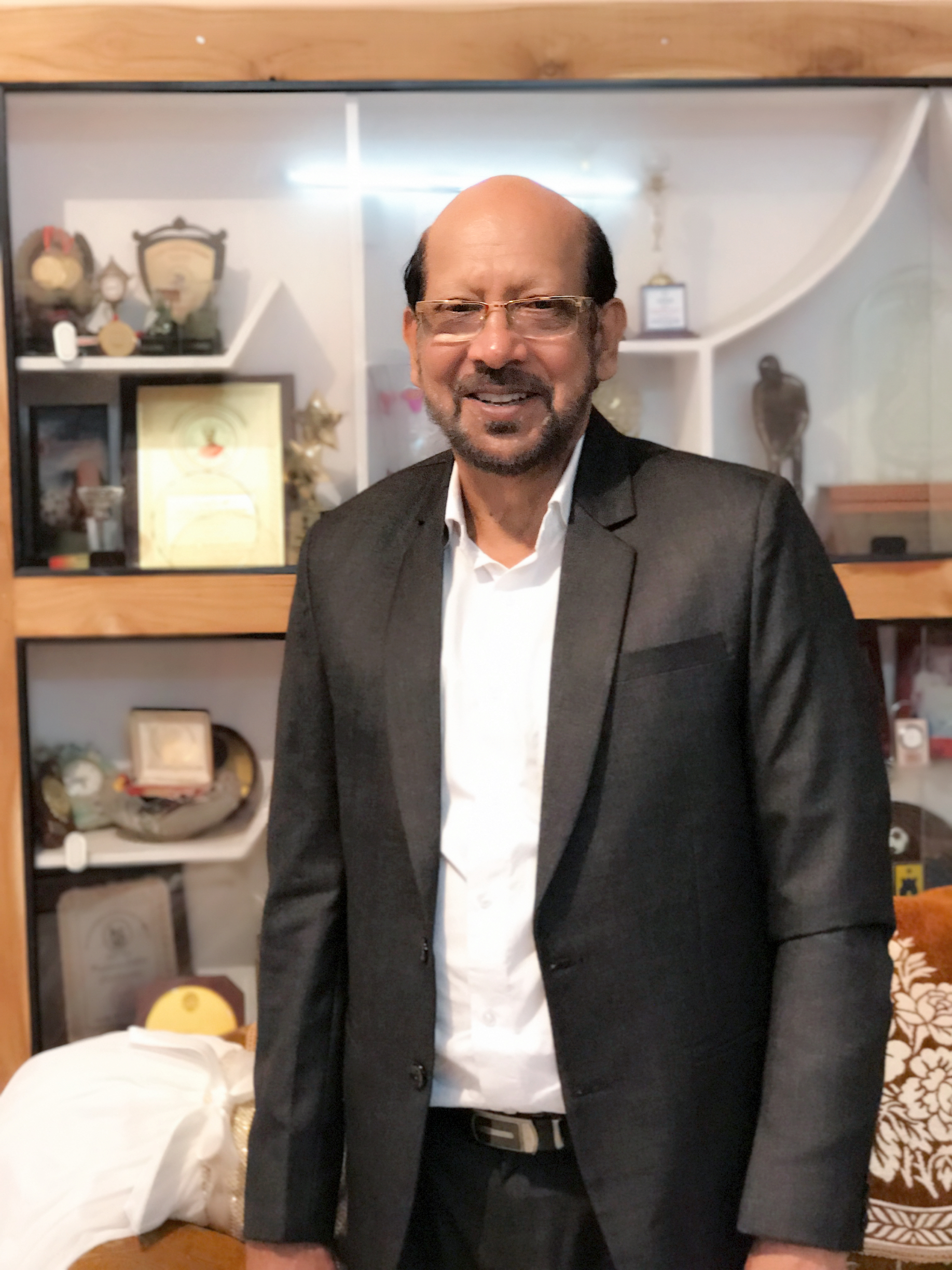
- Ali in August 2017

Personal information
- Date of birth: 26 January 1956 (age 70)
- Place of birth: Hyderabad, Hyderabad State, India
- Position: Striker

Senior career*
| Years | Team | Apps | (Gls) |
| –1972 | Hyderabad Arsenal Club | | |
| 1972 | Tata Sports Hyderabad | | |
| 1978–1979 | East Bengal | | (35) |
| 1973–1984 | Mohammedan | | |
| 1984–1985 | Victoria Sporting Dhaka | | |

International career
| 1974 | India U19 | 6 | (5) |
| 1974–1984 | India | 69 (Note: RSSSF includes the non Full A matches played against Algerian Youth team, South Korean XI and Pakistan XI in their list, but it is excluded here.) | (16) |

Managerial career
- 1985–1992: Mohammedan
- 1992–1993: Rajasthan Club
- 1993–1995: Peerless SC
- 1997–2000: Salgaocar
- 2000–2001: Mahindra United
- 2004: Churchill Brothers
- 2005: Salgaocar
- 2006–2007: Vasco
- 2007–2010: Mohammedan
- 2011–2012: Southern Samity
- Telangana
- * Club domestic league appearances and goals

Shabbir Ali (born 26 January 1956) is an Indian football manager and former player. He was awarded the Dhyan Chand Award, the highest award in Indian sports for lifetime achievement, given by Government of India in 2011. He is the first footballer to be named for the Dhyan Chand Award.

== Club career ==
As a footballer, Ali was rated as the best player in India during the 1970s and 1980s. Arguably the finest striker of his time, Ali was a prolific goal scorer both at the national and international level. He rose to fame at a very early age when he captained India to win the Asian Youth championships in Bangkok jointly with Iran in 1974, a performance which even earned praise from the then Prime Minister, Indira Gandhi.

After playing with Tata Sports Club in Bombay for a few years, Ali was lured away by the top Calcutta club, East Bengal in the late seventies. Later he joined Mohammedan Sporting and took the club to a great height before retiring from the same club in the mid-1980s.

During his captaincy, in 1983–84, the club won nine trophies including back to back wins in Indian Federation Cup. Later in his playing days, he went to Bangladesh to play for Dhaka First Division League side Dhaka Victoria Sporting, where he stayed for a season only.

Ali scored 16 goals in international matches and remains one of India's all-time top scorers, ahead of Chuni Goswami, Pradip Kumar Banerjee, Inder Singh and among others. In the 1976 Merdeka international football tournament in Kuala Lumpur, Ali scored a hat-trick against Indonesia in the first 35 minutes. Only twelve footballers in India have scored an international hat-trick; of those, Ali's is the fastest.

On his 65th birthday, Ali said, "Whatever I have become today because of football. Before retiring I was thinking I got everything from football. Now I have to give something back to the game. So, that is why I became a coach. Before retiring in 1987, I was player-cum-coach of Mohammedan Sporting. In 1988–89, I have pursued a diploma from NIS."

== International career ==
For 12 years between 1972 and 1984, Ali was an automatic choice with the national team of India, be it Asian Youth, Asian Games, pre-Olympics, Asian Cup, Merdeka Cup tournament, Nehru Gold Cup, King's Cup or any other goodwill tour. He also captained India in Asian Youth, pre-Olympics, Nehru Cup, Merdeka and King's Cup tournaments. He gained fame when Arun Ghosh managed India U-20 team under his captaincy, went on to share the 1974 AFC Youth Championship title with Iran-20, in which he scored five goals.

One of his best moments came in the 1976 Merdeka international football tournament in Kuala Lumpur, where he scored a hat-trick against Indonesia within the first 35 minutes. Among Indians who have scored a hat-trick, Ali's was the fastest.

He also appeared in the 1976 Jasson Cup held in Afghanistan, with Indian team managed by Jarnail Singh. He played over 100 international matches for India and scored 30 goals from 1974 to per match.

== International goals ==
"A" international statistics

| Date | Venue | Opponent | Result | Competition | Goals |
|---|---|---|---|---|---|
| 11 August 1976 | Stadium Merdeka, Kuala Lumpur | Thailand | 1976 Merdeka Cup | 1 | |
| 16 August 1976 | Stadium Merdeka, Kuala Lumpur | Indonesia | 1976 Merdeka Cup | 3 | |
| 3 March 1980 | National Stadium, Kallang | Sri Lanka | 1980 Olympic Qualifiers | 2 | |
| 3 September 1981 | National Stadium, Kallang | Japan | 2–3 | 1981 Merdeka | 1 |
| 26 November 1982 | Ambedkar Stadium, New Delhi | China | 2–2 | 1982 Asian Games | 1 |
| 19 October 1983 | National Stadium, Kallang | Indonesia | 4–0 | 1984 Olympic Qualifiers | 2 |
| 22 October 1983 | National Stadium, Kallang | Malaysia | 3–3 | 1984 Olympic Qualifiers | 1 |
| 29 October 1983 | Stadium Merdeka, Kuala Lumpur | Singapore | 1–0 | 1984 Olympic Qualifiers | 1 |
| 31 October 1983 | Stadium Merdeka, Kuala Lumpur | Indonesia | 1–0 | 1984 Olympic Qualifiers | 1 |
| 12 October 1984 | Salt Lake Stadium, Calcutta | North Yemen | 4–0 | 1984 Asian Cup Qualifier | 1 |
| 14 October 1984 | Salt Lake Stadium, Calcutta | Pakistan | 2–0 | 1984 Asian Cup Qualifier | 2 |

== Managerial career ==
After retiring as a footballer in 1985, Ali became a coach. He earned a first class diploma from the Sports Authority of India. He successfully passed the German football association B License coach and also their four-week coaching course, which is equivalent to A License.

As a coach, Ali proved to be a great success within a short period of time. Appointed the technical director of the India, he steered the team to the gold medal in the 1995 South Asian Games in Chennai. It was a superb achievement considering the fact that India failed to win in the three previous South Asian Games at Colombo, Islamabad and Dhaka. He remained the Technical Director till the pre-World Cup tournament in Qatar next year.

In the 1991–92 seasons, he made Mohammedan Sporting the Champion Club of India, having won four tournaments and finished runners-up in two others. Next season, he took up the challenge of coaching a relatively smaller club when he accepted the assignment with Peerless SC. It took him only one season to promote the club to the Calcutta Super Division.

Between 1997 and 1999, Ali managed top Goan outfit Salgaocar and established himself as India's best coach. Barring a few like PK Banerjee and Syed Nayeemuddin, no other coach in India could win so many titles in such a short span as Ali did.

It started in 1998 when Salgaocar won the Goa Professional League under his guidance and went on to win the Indian Super Cup defeating the National League champions, Mohun Bagan AC. Next Salgaocar won the National League title, the only time a Goan team could win it till date. Ali then took the team to Bombay and won the Rovers Cup. Thereafter, the team flew into Delhi to bag the Durand Cup beating both Mohun Bagan and East Bengal and then tamed Mohun Bagan again in the Super Cup contest. No other teams in India have been given such a great run in Indian football in recent years.

He also managed Churchill Brothers in 2004. In 2006, he succeeded Mridul Banerjee as manager of another NFL side Vasco. In 2008, he was again appointment head coach of Mohammedan.

On 2 September 2022, he was unanimously appointed as the chairman of the All India Football Federation Advisory Committee. He is also included in the board of eminent players of the AIFF.

== Football academy ==
In February 2021, Ali launched a football academy in Hyderabad, named Shabbir Ali Football Academy, that became operational from 1 March. The academy is also affiliated with Telangana Football Association.

== Honours ==
=== Player ===
India

- ANFA Cup runner-up: 1983
- Afghanistan Republic Day Cup third place: 1976
- King's Cup third place: 1977

India U20

- AFC Asian U-19 Championship: 1974

Mohammedan Sporting

- Calcutta Football League: 1981
- Federation Cup: 1983–84
- Rovers Cup: 1980, 1984
- Sait Nagjee Trophy: 1984
- DCM Trophy: 1980
- Sikkim Gold Cup: 1980
- Durand Cup runner-up: 1980
- IFA Shield runner-up: 1982

Individual

- AFC Youth Championship top scorer: 1974
- Calcutta Football League top scorer: 1983

=== Manager ===
Mohammedan Sporting

- Federation Cup: 1984–85; runners-up: 1989–90
- Stafford Cup: 1991
- Rovers Cup: 1987; runner-up: 1991
- Sait Nagjee Trophy: 1991, 1992
- Bordoloi Trophy: 1985, 1986, 1991
- All Airlines Gold Cup: 1986; runner-up: 1987, 1988, 1989, 1990
- Independence Day Cup: 1988
- Sikkim Governor's Gold Cup runner-up: 1986, 1987, 1989, 1991
- Kalinga Cup: 1991
- Vizag Trophy: 1986

Salgaocar

- National Football League: 1998–99

== Awards ==
- Dhyan Chand Award in 2011, towards his service to coach Goan outfit Salgaocar Club between 1997 and 1999.
- Banga Bhushan in 2014 by the Government of West Bengal
- Krida Guru Award by the Government of West Bengal: 2018

== See also ==
- List of India national football team hat-tricks
- List of Indian football players in foreign leagues
- List of India national football team captains
