= R. Lumsden (footballer) =

Indian footballer

Personal information
- Place of birth: British India
- Position: Forward

Senior career*
Years	Team	Apps	(Gls)
- Calcutta Rangers

International career
1938	India	5	(8)
- * Club domestic league appearances and goals

R. Lumsden was an Indian footballer, who played for the India national football team as a striker.

== Football career ==
Lumsden played for Calcutta Rangers in the Calcutta Football League.

He was India's first ever hat-trick scorer. He scored it against Australia national football team during a friendly match on 24 September 1938. His hat-trick includes a penalty at the 46th minutes.

Lumsden scored eight official goals for India from five international friendly matches against Australia during the Australia tour, considered as first ever international tour of the national side. He also scored two more hat-tricks and a total of 10 goals from 11 matches during that tour from some friendly matches against clubs and Australian state teams.

== International statistics ==
Scores and results list India's goal tally first.

Goal	Date	Venue	Opponent	Score	Result	Competition
1	3 September 1938	Royal Agricultural Show Ground, Sydney, Australia	Australia	3–4	3–5	Friendly
2	10 September 1938	Royal Brisbane Exhibition Ground, Brisbane, Australia	Australia	4–4	4–4	Friendly
3	17 September 1938	Newcastle Sports Ground, Newcastle, Australia	Australia	2–1	4–1	Friendly
4	17 September 1938	Newcastle Sports Ground, Newcastle, Australia	Australia	3–1 †	4–1	Friendly
5	24 September 1938	Royal Agricultural Show Ground, Sydney, Australia	Australia	1–3	4–5	Friendly
6	24 September 1938	Royal Agricultural Show Ground, Sydney, Australia	Australia	2–3	4–5	Friendly
7	24 September 1938	Royal Agricultural Show Ground, Sydney, Australia	Australia	3–4 †	4–5	Friendly
8	1 October 1938	Melbourne Showgrounds, Victoria, Australia	Australia	1–2	1–3	Friendly

† indicates that the goal was scored through penalty kick.

== See also ==
- List of India national football team hat-tricks
- History of the India national football team

== Bibliography ==
- Kapadia, Novy (2017). Barefoot to Boots: The Many Lives of Indian Football. Penguin Random House. ISBN 978-0-143-42641-7.
- Martinez, Dolores; Mukharji, Projit B (2009). Football: From England to the World: The Many Lives of Indian Football. Routledge. ISBN 978-1-138-88353-6. Archived from the original on 2 July 2022.
- Sharma, Nikhil Paramjit; Gupta, Shantanu (4 February 2019). India's Football Dream. SAGE Publications India. ISBN 9789353283063. Archived from the original on 4 October 2022.
- Dutta, P. L., Memoir of 'Father of Indian Football' Nagendraprasad Sarbadhikary (Calcutta: N. P. Sarbadhikary Memorial Committee, 1944) (hereafter Memoir)
- Majumdar, Boria, Bandyopadhyay, Kausik (2006). Goalless: The Story of a Unique Footballing Nation. Penguin India. ISBN 9780670058747.
- Nath, Nirmal (2011). History of Indian Football: Upto 2009–10. Readers Service. ISBN 9788187891963. Archived from the original on 22 July 2022.
- Dineo, Paul; Mills, James (2001). Soccer in South Asia: Empire, Nation, Diaspora. London, United Kingdom: Frank Cass Publishers. ISBN 978-0-7146-8170-2. Archived from the original on 25 July 2022.
- "Triumphs and Disasters: The Story of Indian Football, 1889—2000" (PDF). Archived from the original (PDF) on 13 August 2012.
- D'Mello, Anthony (1959). Portrait Of Indian Sport. P R Macmillan Limited, London.
- From recreation to competition: Early history of Indian football. pp. 124–141. Published online: 6 Aug 2006. www.tandfonline.com. Retrieved 30 June 2021.
- Sengupta, Somnath (29 July 2011). "Tactical Evolution Of Indian Football (Part One): Profiling Three Great 2-3-5 Teams". thehardtackle.com. Kolkata: The Hard Tackle. Archived from the original on 9 October 2021.
- Majumdar, Boria; Bandyopadhyay, Kausik (2006). A Social History Of Indian Football: Striving To Score. Routledge. ISBN 9780415348355. Archived from the original on 29 June 2021.
- Basu, Jaydeep (2003). Stories from Indian Football. UBS Publishers' Distributors. ISBN 9788174764546. Archived from the original on 11 October 2022.
