= List of India national football team hat-tricks =

National team hat-tricks list

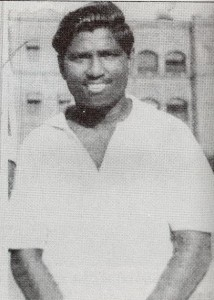
Sheoo Mewalal, the first hat-trick scorer for India since independence

The first player ever to score a hat-trick (three or more goals in a match) for India in an international football match was R. Lumsden. He achieved the feat in an official friendly match against Australia on 24 September 1938, at the Sydney Showground, although India lost the match 4–5. This is the only instance when India have lost a game in which a player scored a hat-trick for the team. Lumsden was the only footballer to score a hat-trick for India before independence. Since independence in 1947, eleven Indian players have scored a hat-trick in an international football match. No Indian player has ever scored more than three goals in a single game. The first player after independence to score a hat-trick for India was Sheoo Mewalal in a 4–0 victory over Burma in the 1952 Asian Quadrangular Football Tournament.

K. Appalaraju and Sunil Chhetri are the only Indian footballers to have scored a hat-trick more than once. Appalaraju achieved the feat twice in the two-legged tie against Ceylon during the 1964 Olympic Qualifiers. Chhetri has achieved the feat four times, the latest of which came in India's 4–0 victory over Pakistan in the opening match of the 2023 SAFF Championship. This is also the most recent instance of an Indian player scoring a hat-trick in an international football match. Chhetri's first hat-trick came in the final of the 2008 AFC Challenge Cup against Tajikistan, which helped India not only to win the cup but also to qualify directly for the AFC Asian Cup in 2011, the first time in 27 years that the team reached the final tournament.

Neville D'Souza was the first Asian to score a hat-trick in the history of Olympic football. He achieved the feat in a 4–2 victory over Australia at the 1956 Melbourne Olympics. With four goals in three matches, he not only finished the tournament as joint top-scorer but also helped India become the first Asian team to reach the semi-finals of the tournament. Shabbir Ali scored the fastest hat-trick for the national team. He achieved the feat in a 3−1 victory over Indonesia on 16 August 1976, at the 1976 Merdeka Tournament. His goals came at the 7th, 33rd and 35th minutes of the match.

As of 29 March 2021, India have conceded twenty hat-tricks, the most recent being scored by Ali Mabkhout in a 0–6 defeat by the United Arab Emirates in a friendly match. Branko Zebec was the first player to score a hat-trick against India, scoring four times for Yugoslavia in the 1952 Helsinki Olympics. Two other players, Bader Al-Mutawa of Kuwait in a friendly fixture and Ismail Abdullatif of Bahrain in the 2011 AFC Asian Cup, have also scored four goals against India. The only instance of India not losing a game even after conceding a hat-trick occurred against Yemen in a 2002 FIFA World Cup qualification match on 4 May 2001, which ended in a 3–3 draw.

== Hat-tricks for India ==
As of 21 June 2023, eleven players have scored a hat-trick for the national team.
Only FIFA-recognized international matches by the India national football team have been considered in the following list.
Result in the table lists India's goal tally first

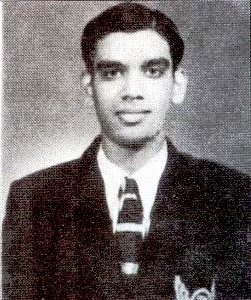
Neville D'Souza, the first ever Indian and Asian hat-trick scorer at the Olympics

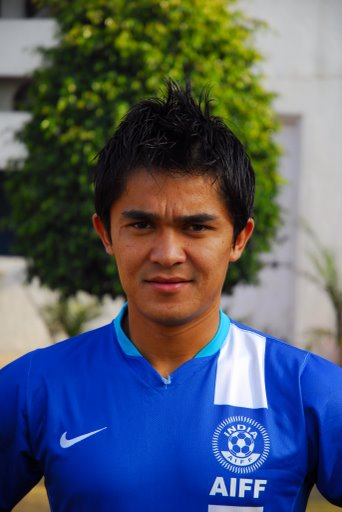
Sunil Chhetri has scored a hat-trick four times, the most by any Indian footballer.

Date	Goals	Player	Opponent	Venue	Competition	Result	Ref.
24 September 1938	3	R. Lumsden	Australia	Sydney Showground, Sydney	Friendly	4–5	
16 March 1952	3	Sheoo Mewalal	(Myanmar) Burma	Colombo, Ceylon	1952 Asian Quadrangular Football Tournament	4–0	
26 December 1954	3	Puran Bahadur Thapa	Pakistan	Eden Gardens, Kolkata	1954 Asian Quadrangular Football Tournament	3–1	
1 December 1956	3	Neville D'Souza	Australia	Olympic Park Stadium, Melbourne	1956 Summer Olympics	4–2	
22 December 1963	3	K. Appalaraju	(Dominion of Ceylon) Ceylon	Sugathadasa Stadium, Colombo	1964 Olympic Qualifiers	5–3	
29 December 1963	3	K. Appalaraju	(Dominion of Ceylon) Ceylon	Bangalore	1964 Olympic Qualifiers	7–0	
16 August 1967	3	Marto Gracias	Hong Kong	Merdeka Stadium, Kuala Lumpur	1967 Merdeka Tournament	4–0	
5 August 1971	3	Subhash Bhowmick	Philippines	Merdeka Stadium, Kuala Lumpur	1971 Merdeka Tournament	5–1	
23 July 1974	3	Magan Singh Rajvi	Thailand	Ipoh, Malaya	1974 Merdeka Tournament	4–2	
16 August 1976	3	Shabbir Ali	Indonesia	Merdeka Stadium, Kuala Lumpur	1976 Merdeka Tournament	3–1	
30 June 1986	3	Krishanu Dey	Thailand	Stadium Jalan Raja Muda, Kuala Lumpur	1986 Merdeka Tournament	3–1	
26 September 1999	3	I. M. Vijayan	Pakistan	Kathmandu	1999 South Asian Games	5–2	
13 August 2008	3	Sunil Chhetri	Tajikistan	Ambedkar Stadium, New Delhi	2008 AFC Challenge Cup	4–1	
8 October 2010	3	Sunil Chhetri	Vietnam	Balewadi Sports Complex, Pune	Friendly	3–1	
1 June 2018	3	Sunil Chhetri	Chinese Taipei	Mumbai Football Arena, Mumbai	2018 Intercontinental Cup	5–0	
21 June 2023	3	Sunil Chhetri	Pakistan	Sree Kanteerava Stadium, Bangalore	2023 SAFF Championship	4–0	

== Hat-tricks conceded by India ==
As of 29 March 2021, India have conceded fifteen hat-tricks in total.
Result in the table lists India's goal tally first

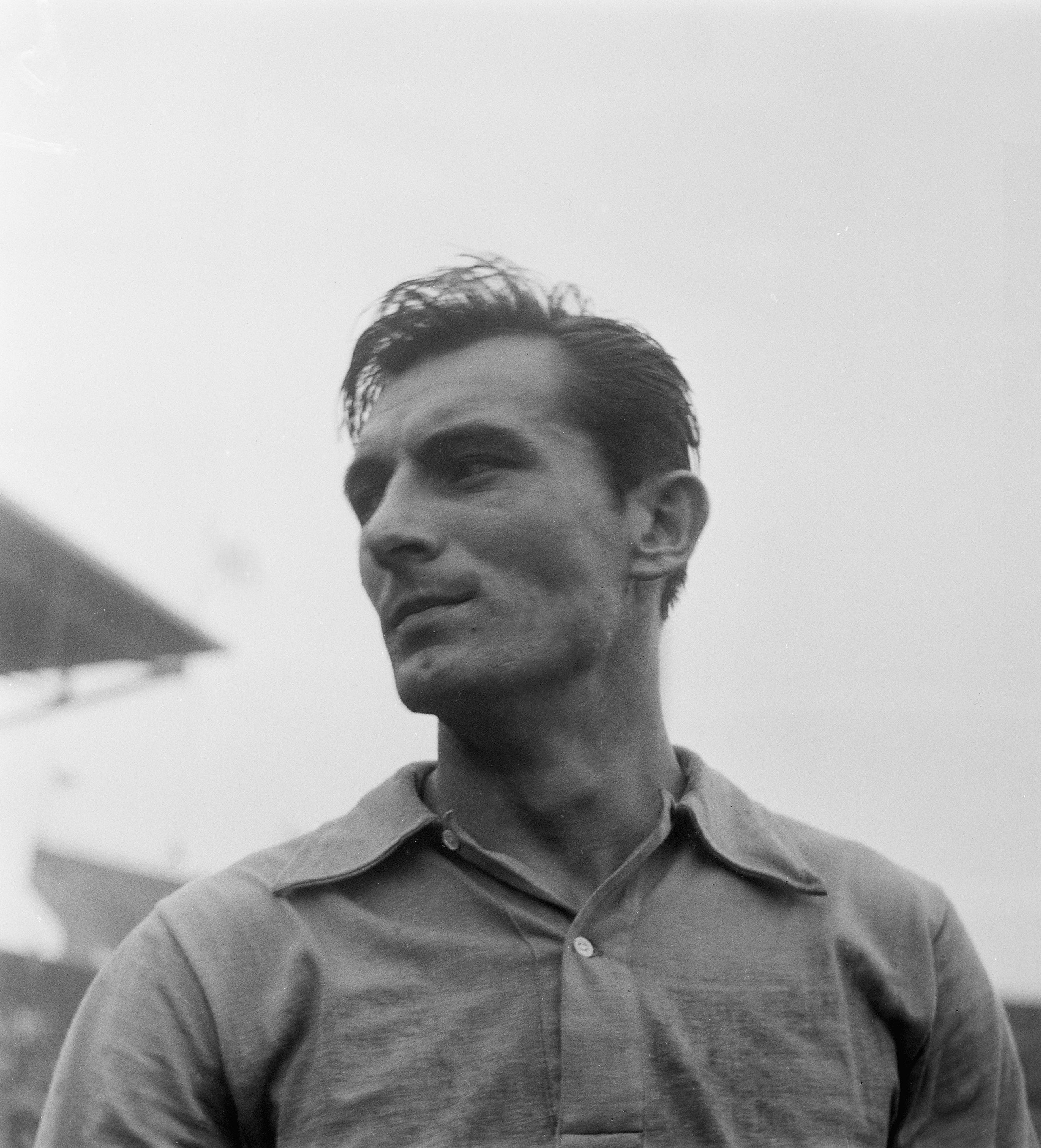
Branko Zebec of Yugoslavia was the first player to score a hat-trick against India.

Date	Goals	Player	Opponent	Venue	Competition	Result	Ref.
15 July 1952	4	Branko Zebec	(Socialist Federal Republic of Yugoslavia) Yugoslavia	Helsingen Pallokentta, Helsinki	1952 Summer Olympics	1–10	
16 September 1955	3	Eduard Streltsov	Soviet Union	Dinamo Stadium, Moscow	Friendly	1–11	
16 September 1955	3	Sergei Salnikov	Soviet Union	Dinamo Stadium, Moscow	Friendly	1–11	
8 December 1959	3	Rafi Levi	Israel	Maharaja College Ground, Kochi	1960 AFC Asian Cup qualification	1–3	
2 November 1969	3	Ye Nyunt	(Myanmar) Burma	Merdeka Stadium, Kuala Lumpur	1969 Merdeka Tournament	0–6	
6 August 1971	3	Ye Nyunt	(Myanmar) Burma	Merdeka Stadium, Kuala Lumpur	1971 Merdeka Tournament	1–9	
7 August 1971	3	Kainun Waskito	Indonesia	Merdeka Stadium, Kuala Lumpur	1971 Merdeka Tournament	1–3	
18 September 1971	3	Viktor Kolotov	Soviet Union	Dynamo Stadium, Moscow	Friendly	0–5	
10 August 1976	3	Cha Bum-Kun	South Korea	Merdeka Stadium, Kuala Lumpur	1976 Merdeka Tournament	0–8	
7 September 1977	3	Cherdsak Chaiyabutr	Thailand	Busan Gudeok Stadium, Busan	1977 President's Cup Football Tournament	0–4	
6 November 1983	4	Majed Abdullah	Saudi Arabia	Prince Faisal bin Fahd Sports City Stadium, Riyadh	1984 Summer Olympics qualifiers	0–5	
9 June 1993	3	Lee Gi-bum	South Korea	Seoul, South Korea	1994 FIFA World Cup qualification	0–7	
13 January 2001	3	Tryggvi Guðmundsson	Iceland	Jawaharlal Nehru Stadium, Kochi	Millennium Super Soccer Cup	0–3	
4 May 2001	3	Adel Al-Salimi	Yemen	Althawra Sports City Stadium, Sana'a	2002 FIFA World Cup qualification	3–3	
16 August 2006	3	Yasser Al-Qahtani	Saudi Arabia	Salt Lake Stadium, Kolkata	2007 AFC Asian Cup qualification	0–3	
14 November 2010	4	Bader Al-Mutawa	Kuwait	Al Nahyan Stadium, Abu Dhabi	Friendly	1–9	
14 January 2011	4	Ismail Abdullatif	Bahrain	Jassim bin Hamad Stadium, Doha	2011 AFC Asian Cup	2–5	
29 November 2011	3	Bruce Musakanya	Zambia	Jawaharlal Nehru Stadium, Margao	Friendly	0–5	
6 February 2013	3	Ashraf Nu'man	Palestine	Jawaharlal Nehru Stadium, Kochi	Friendly	2–4	
29 March 2021	3	Ali Mabkhout	United Arab Emirates	Zabeel Stadium, Dubai	Friendly	0–6	

== See also ==
- History of the India national football team
- India national football team at the Olympics
- India national football team at the FIFA World Cup qualification
- India at the AFC Asian Cup
