= Marto Gracias =

Indian footballer

Personal information
- Place of birth: Goa, India
- Date of death: 24 July 2016 (aged 75)

Senior career*
Years	Team	Apps	(Gls)
- Salgaocar SC
- Tata SC

International career
- India
- * Club domestic league appearances and goals

Marto Gracias (died 24 July 2016) was an Indian footballer who played club football for Salgaocar SC and Tata SC, as a representative for Goa and Maharashtra, and on the India national team. He scored a hat-trick for the national team in a 4–0 win against Hong Kong in the 1967 Merdeka Cup.
