= 2023 Intercontinental Cup (India) =

International football tournament hosted by AIFF

2023 Hero Intercontinental Cup
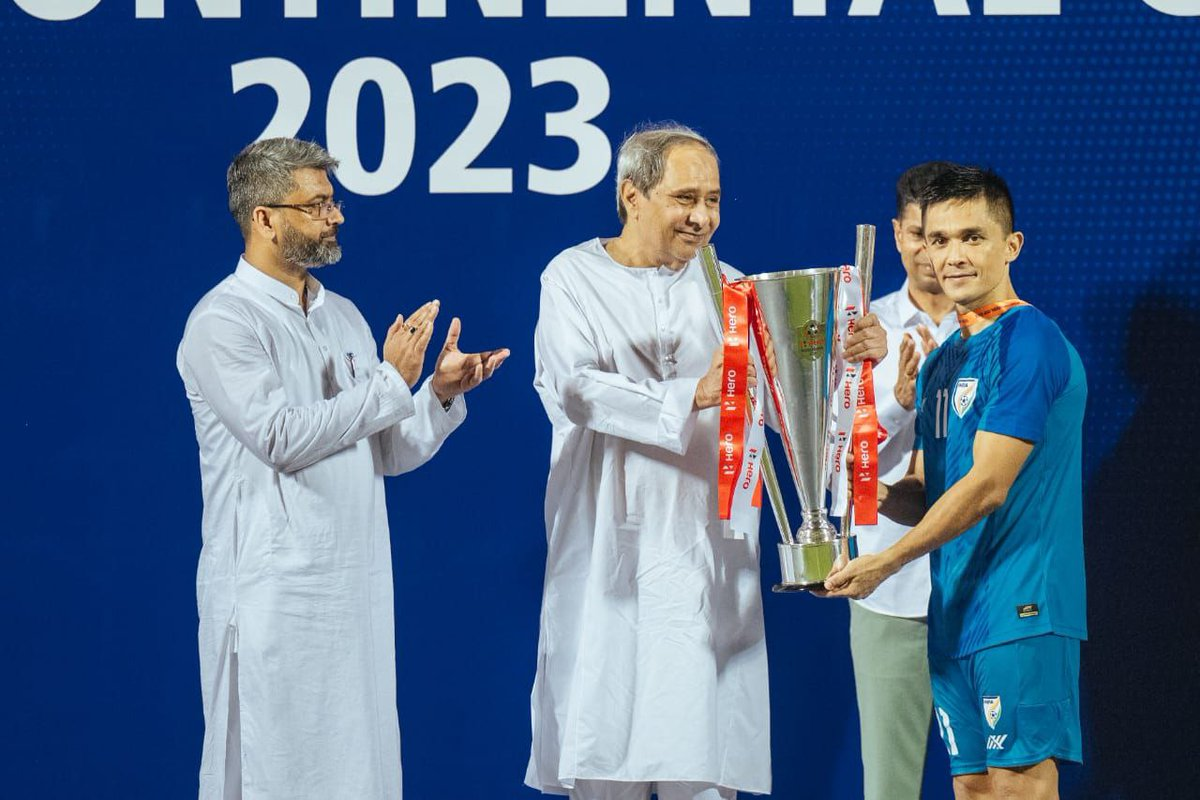
- Naveen Patnaik handing the 2023 Intercontinental Cup trophy to Sunil Chhetri.

Tournament details
- Host country: India
- City: Bhubaneswar
- Dates: 9–18 June 2023
- Teams: 4 (from 2 confederations)
- Venue: 1 (in 1 host city)

Final positions
- Champions: India (2nd title)
- Runners-up: Lebanon
- Third place: Vanuatu
- Fourth place: Mongolia

Tournament statistics
- Matches played: 7
- Goals scored: 10 (1.43 per match)
- Attendance: 31,200 (4,457 per match)
- Top scorer(s): (India) Lallianzuala Chhangte (India) Sunil Chhetri (2 goals each)
- Best player: (India) Sandesh Jhingan

The 2023 Intercontinental Cup (known as the 2023 Hero Intercontinental Cup for sponsorship reasons) was the third edition of the Intercontinental Cup, a four-nation football tournament held at the Kalinga Stadium, in the Indian city of Bhubaneswar between the 9 to 18 June 2023. The tournament was organized by the All India Football Federation (AIFF). North Korea won the previous edition by a 1–0 victory over Tajikistan in the final in 2019. India became the champion of this edition after defeating Lebanon by 2–0 in the final. With two goals each, Lallianzuala Chhangte and Sunil Chhetri of India were joint-top scorers of the tournament. Sandesh Jhingan of India was awarded best player of the tournament.

== Participating nations ==
The tournament was played by teams from two different confederations in the FIFA international window from 9 to 18 June 2023. India, as host, is joined by Lebanon and Mongolia from the Asian Football Confederation (AFC), and Vanuatu from the Oceania Football Confederation (OFC). The teams play each other in a round-robin phase, and the top two teams played the final.

The FIFA Rankings of the participating national teams, as of 6 April 2023:

- Lebanon (99)
- India (101)
- Vanuatu (164)
- Mongolia (183)

== Venue ==
- All matches are being held at the Kalinga Stadium in Bhubaneswar, India.

Bhubaneswar	2023 Intercontinental Cup (India) is located in India
Kalinga Stadium	2023 Intercontinental Cup (India) is located in India
20°17′17″N 85°49′25.5″E	2023 Intercontinental Cup (India) is located in India
Capacity: 15,000 seats	2023 Intercontinental Cup (India) is located in India

== Prize money ==
Position	Amount (USD)
Champions	100000
Runners-up	50000

== Standings ==
=== Round robin ===
Pos	Team	Pld	W	D	L	GF	GA	GD	Pts	Qualification
1	India (H)	3	2	1	0	3	0	+3	7	Advances to Final
2	Lebanon	3	1	2	0	3	1	+2	5	Advances to Final
3	Vanuatu	3	1	0	2	2	4	−2	3	
4	Mongolia	3	0	1	2	0	3	−3	1	

Source: AIFF
(H) Hosts

== Matches ==
9 June 2023
16:30

Lebanon	3–1	Vanuatu
Matar 59'; Kourani 72'; Darwich 85' (pen.)	Report	Wohale 62'

Kalinga Stadium, Bhubaneswar
Attendance: 400
Referee: Harish Kundu (India)
9 June 2023
19:30

India	2–0	Mongolia
Samad 2'; Chhangte 14'	Report

Kalinga Stadium, Bhubaneswar
Attendance: 6,200
Referee: Songkran Bunmeekiart (Thailand)

12 June 2023
16:30

Mongolia	0–0	Lebanon
	Report

Kalinga Stadium, Bhubaneswar
Attendance: 200
Referee: Ramachandran Venkatesh (India)
12 June 2023
19:30

Vanuatu	0–1	India
	Report	Chhetri 81'

Kalinga Stadium, Bhubaneswar
Attendance: 6,200
Referee: Virendha Rai (Bhutan)

15 June 2023
16:30

Vanuatu	1–0	Mongolia
Gantuya 46' (o.g.)	Report

Kalinga Stadium, Bhubaneswar
Attendance: 200
Referee: Songkran Bunmeekiart (Thailand)
15 June 2023
19:30

India	0–0	Lebanon
	Report

Kalinga Stadium, Bhubaneswar
Attendance: 5,400
Referee: Javiz Mohamed (Maldives)

=== Final ===
18 June 2023
19:30

India	2–0	Lebanon
Chhetri 46'; Chhangte 65'	Report

Kalinga Stadium, Bhubaneswar
Attendance: 12,600
Referee: Virendha Rai (Bhutan)

== Winners ==
2023 Intercontinental Cup Champion

India
Second title

== Goalscorers ==
There were 10 goals scored in 7 matches, for an average of 1.43 goals per match.

2 goals

- (India) Lallianzuala Chhangte
- (India) Sunil Chhetri

1 goal

- (India) Sahal Abdul Samad
- (Lebanon) Karim Darwich
- (Lebanon) Hassan Kourani
- (Lebanon) Nader Matar
- (Vanuatu) John Wohale

1 own goal

- (Mongolia) Gantogtokh Gantuya (against Vanuatu)
