= Magan Singh Rajvi =

Indian footballer

Magan Singh
Personal information
- Full name: Magan Singh Rajvi
- Place of birth: Dheengsari, Rajasthan, India
- Positions: Winger; striker

Senior career*
Years	Team	Apps	(Gls)
- RAC Bikaner
- Mohun Bagan
- East Bengal
- Salgaocar

International career^{‡}
1968–1974	India	36 (Note: RSSSF credits the first goal scored by India in their 3–4 defeat to Burma in 1972 Olympic Qualifier to Rajvi. However the News articles credit the goal to Gurdev Singh.)	(15)

Managerial career
- 2020–: Rajasthan United (Technical director)
Medal record
Men's football
Representing India
Asian Games
Bronze medal – third place	1970 Bangkok	Team
- * Club domestic league appearances and goals ‡ National team caps and goals as of 22:30 (UTC), 2 February 2019

Magan Singh Rajvi is a former Indian football player. He hails from Indian state of Rajasthan. He was part of the Indian football team which won bronze medal at the 1970 Asian Games. He also captained the Indian team in 1973 and 1974. He is one of the few and 6th hat trick scorer of India which he scored against Thailand on 23 July 1974 at 1974 Merdeka Cup.

== Personal life ==
Magan Singh is a retired Superintendent of Police (RAC) Bikaner Range. He is from a village situated 60 km from Bikaner named Dheengsari. He is related to Maharaja Karni Singh of Bikaner, who won Arjun Awarda in 1961 in shooting. His elder brother Chain Singh Rajvi was also an illustrious and accomplished footballer who attended Indian Football team camp and was also the vice-captain of the famous RAC Bikaner Football Team of which Magan Singh was captain. He was additional Superintendent of Police.

== International goals ==
FIFA "A" international statistics (Note: RSSSF credits the first goal scored by India in their 3–4 defeat to Burma in 1972 Olympic Qualifier to Rajvi. However the News articles credit the goal to Gurdev Singh.)

Date	Venue	Opponent	Result	Competition	Goals
4 November 1969	Kuala Lumpur, Malaya	Singapore	3–0	1969 Merdeka Tournament	1
15 August 1970	Kuala Lumpur, Malaya	Hong Kong	3–2	1970 Merdeka Tournament	2
12 December 1970	Bangkok, Thailand	South Vietnam	2–0	1970 Asian Games	1
15 December 1970	Bangkok, Thailand	Indonesia	3–0	1970 Asian Games	1
15 August 1971	Kuala Lumpur, Malaya	Burma	1–9	1971 Merdeka Tournament	1
26 July 1973	Kuala Lumpur, Malaya	South Vietnam	2–1	1973 Merdeka Tournament	1
1 August 1973	Kuala Lumpur, Malaya	Khmer Republic	3–0	1973 Merdeka Tournament	1
23 July 1974	Perak Stadium, Ipoh	Thailand	4–2	1974 Merdeka Tournament	3
25 July 1974	Perak Stadium, Ipoh	Malaysia	1–4	1974 Merdeka Tournament	1
29 July 1974	Perak Stadium, Ipoh	Hong Kong	2–2	1974 Merdeka Tournament	1
4 September 1974	Aryamehr Stadium, Tehran	China	1–7	1974 Asian Games	1
6 September 1974	Amjadieh Stadium, Tehran	North Korea	1–4	1974 Asian Games	1

Non FIFA statistics

Date	Venue	Opponent	Result	Competition	Goals
5 August 1970	Kuala Lumpur, Malaya	Western Australia	2–0	1970 Merdeka Tournament	2

== Honours ==
India

- Asian Games Bronze Medal: 1970
- Merdeka Tournament third place: 1970

Individual

- Received Arjuna Award in 1973 for his achievements as a football player.

== See also ==
- List of India national football team hat-tricks
- List of India national football team captains

== Bibliography ==
- Kapadia, Novy (2017). Barefoot to Boots: The Many Lives of Indian Football. Penguin Random House. ISBN 978-0-143-42641-7.
- Martinez, Dolores; Mukharjiim, Projit B (2009). Football: From England to the World: The Many Lives of Indian Football. Routledge. ISBN 978-1-138-88353-6. Archived from the original on 2 July 2022.
- Nath, Nirmal (2011). History of Indian Football: Upto 2009–10. Readers Service. ISBN 9788187891963. Archived from the original on 22 July 2022.
- Dineo, Paul; Mills, James (2001). Soccer in South Asia: Empire, Nation, Diaspora. London, United Kingdom: Frank Cass Publishers. ISBN 978-0-7146-8170-2. Archived from the original on 25 July 2022.
- Majumdar, Boria; Bandyopadhyay, Kausik (2006). A Social History Of Indian Football: Striving To Score. Routledge. ISBN 9780415348355. Archived from the original on 29 June 2021.
- Basu, Jaydeep (2003). Stories from Indian Football. UBS Publishers' Distributors. ISBN 9788174764546. Archived from the original on 11 October 2022.
