= Tulsidas Balaram =

Indian footballer (1936–2023)

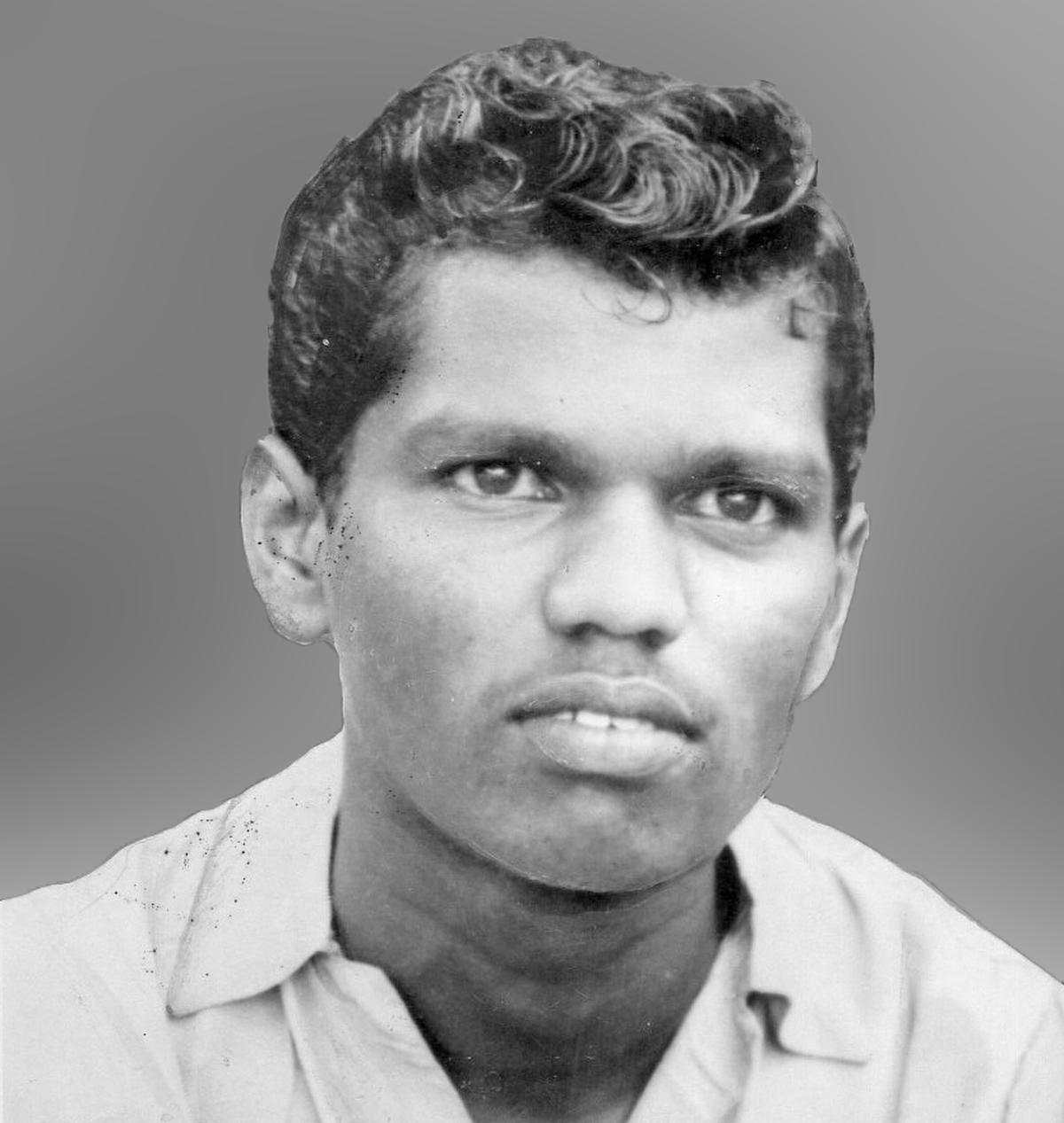
- Balaram in 1959

Personal information
- Date of birth: 4 October 1936
- Place of birth: Bolaram, Secunderabad, Hyderabad State, British Raj
- Date of death: 16 February 2023 (aged 86)
- Place of death: Kolkata, West Bengal, India
- Height: 1.73 m (5 ft 8 in)
- Position: Forward

Senior career*
Years	Team	Apps	(Gls)
1954	Army Combat Force		
1955	Rider's Club Hyderabad		
- Hyderabad City Police
1957–1962	East Bengal		(104)
- Bengal Nagpur Railway

International career
1956–1962	India	32 (Note: RSSSF mistakenly includes a goal from the match against Afghanistan and Iran in 1959 and doesn't count the brace Tulsidas scored against Tunisia in a 2–2 draw.)	(11)
Medal record
Men's football
Representing India
Asian Games
Gold medal – first place	1962 Jakarta	Team
- * Club domestic league appearances and goals

Tulsidas Balaram (30 November 1936 – 16 February 2023), also known as Tulsidas Balaraman, was an Indian footballer. Balaram represented India in multiple international tournaments, including the Asian Games, the Mederka Cup and the Olympics. Along with P. K. Banerjee and Chuni Goswami, Balaram was part of an acclaimed trio of players that helped propel India into what is widely regarded as its golden age of football during the 1950s and 60s.

Balaram made his mark playing football for the East Bengal of Kolkata, and captained the team in 1961–62. He predominantly played as a center or left-wing forward In 1962, he received Arjuna Award from the Government of India.

He retired after playing for eight years due to a tuberculosis diagnosis at the age of 27.

== Early life ==
Balaram was born into a Tamil dalit family on October 4, 1936, in Ammuguda, a village near Secunderabad in British-occupied Hyderabad. Despite being born into poverty, Balaram showed interest in football from a young age. He recalls getting his first pair of football boots by convincing a cobbler to repurpose an old pair of torn police shoes. When he was 19, he was encouraged by Syed Abdul Rahim to try out for the Hyderabad team for the 1956 Santosh Trophy. Rahim provided Balaram with a monthly allowance for a bicycle so that he could commute from his village to practice in Hyderabad.

== Club career ==
After his parents migrated to Secundrabad, Balaram started playing football at the Lallaguda workshop ground, and practised Hyderabadi style of one-touch football. He was scouted during a Secunderabad League match between Civilians and Army XI. He then appeared with Ryders Club, and eventually impress chief guest, Indian manager Syed Abdul Rahim. Balaram first played for the Hyderabad team in the 1956 Santosh Trophy. He scored against Bombay in the final, contributing to Hyderabad's 4–1 championship win.

After the 1956 Melbourne Olympics, Balaram was signed by East Bengal Club in Kolkata by then secretary J. C. Guha. He became the highest paid player in the club at that time with a salary amount of Rs. 3,500. He soon went on to serve as team captain. With the "red and gold brigade", Balaram won several titles including the 1958 IFA Shield and the Santosh Trophy in 1959, 1960, and 1962. During his days in East Bengal, Balaram played under coach Sushil Bhattacharya. In the 1959 CFL season, he finished as second highest goalscorer with 23 goals. He also played for Bengal Nagpur Railway with Arun Ghosh.

== International career ==
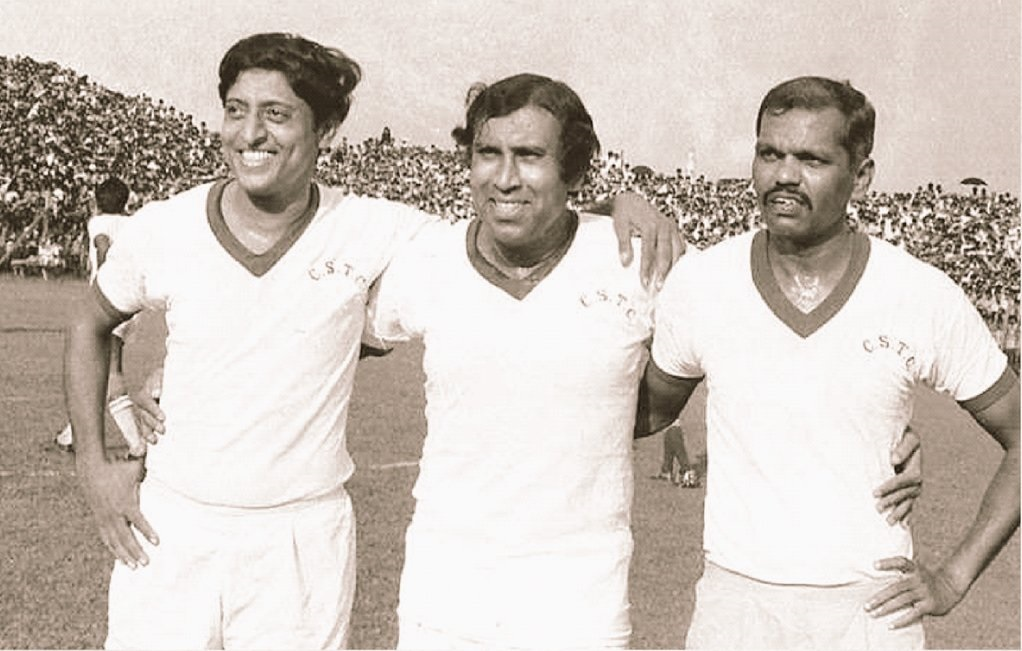
"Golden Trio" of Indian football, Balaram in extreme right, along with Goswami (in left) and PK Banerjee, at the 1962 Asian Games.

Balaram played a total of 33 matches for India and scored 12 goals in international tournaments.

=== Olympic Games ===
Balaram was recruited to the India national team for the 1956 Melbourne Olympics and made his international debut against Yugoslavia. Balaram and the Indian team finished in 4th place in 1956, marking India's best-ever finish in football at the Olympic games.

At the 1960 Summer Olympics in Rome, Balaram was responsible for 2 out of 3 Indian goals throughout the tournament. India were placed in the so-called "group of death", with Hungary, France, and Peru. They started the competition against Hungary, losing the game 2–1, with Balaram scoring India's first goal in the tournament at the 79th minute. Although they lost, the resulting score added to India's credibility within the group stage as the Hungarians beat Peru and France 6–2 and 7–0, respectively. India almost upset 1958 World Cup semi-finalists France a few days later, with Balaram playing a pivotal role in the 1–0 lead deep into second half. Balaram was the Indian team's only scorer in their final match of the tournament, a 3–1 loss to Peru.

=== Asian Games ===
During the 1958 Asian Games in Tokyo, India's match against Hong Kong went into extra time after the scoreline was 2–2 during normal time. Despite an injury, Balaram assisted with two goals and scored one as India won 5–2.

One of the more popular and widely recognized moments in his career came when India won the gold medal at the 1962 Asian Games in Jakarta. Balaram played every game and scored two goals, one each against Thailand and Japan. This marked the second time India has come in first place for football at the Asian games.

== Coaching career ==
After retirement, Balaram went on to manage one of the prestigious multi-sports clubs in Kolkata, Bengal Nagpur Railway. He was later appointed coach of Calcutta Mayor's XI, and guided the team in competitions like Gothia Cup in Sweden, and played a key role in bringing up players including Basudev Mandal, Mehtab Hossain, and Sangram Mukherjee. When a youth team under his coaching got an invitation to play in Germany, his visa was denied by Indian Govt. His team eventually played in Berlin, remaining unbeaten in four games. Balaram also worked as advisor of the Dum Dum Municipality's Kingston–Nikhil Nandy Football Academy.

== Reception and legacy ==
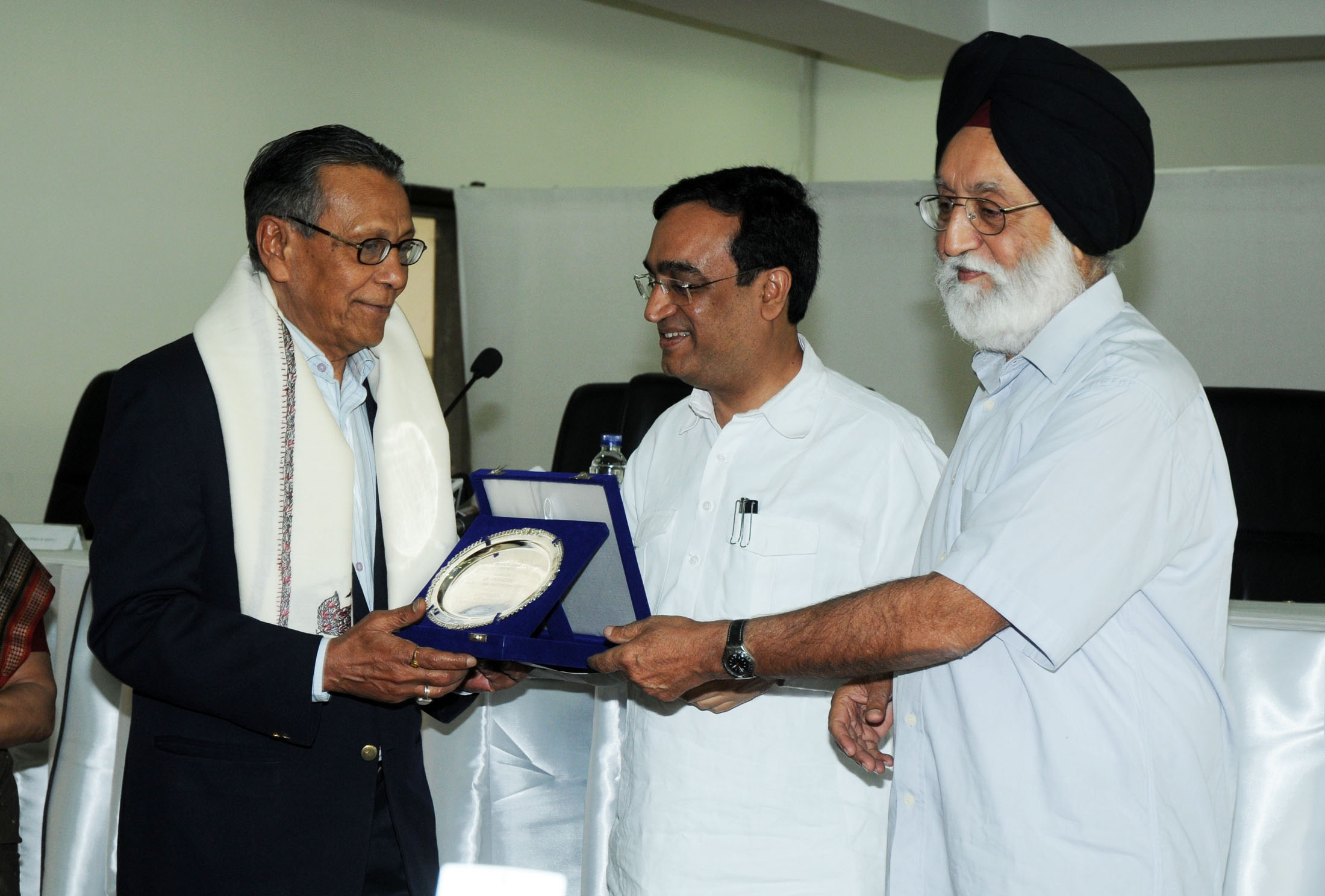
Balaram (in left) being felicitated by M. S. Gill and Ajay Maken in April 2011

Tulsidas Balaram was a complete player and could've fitted very well into today's total football. He could dribble, he could score and he had a brilliant header. Balaram was probably the best in Asia in his days.

— Gautam Roy, football historian, on Balaram to the Olympic Channel.

Indian sports journalist Ajay Basu described Balaram as a "superb inside forward". Basu further praised Balaram's improvisation, industriousness and ability to hit curling shots, stating that "while Chuni Goswami had more flair in his play, Balaram had more variety and versatility."

Former Indian international defender Arun Ghosh described Balaram as a man who had "two eyes on the back of his head" due to the high quality of his ball distribution. He was also the central figure of his teams, directing most attacking moves.

Balaram, known for having a strong partnership with Chuni Goswami and P. K. Banerjee, is considered one of the "Indian football's holy trinity".

Balaram retired from playing in 1963 due to a tuberculosis diagnosis. After his death, players of both India and Kyrgyz Republic paid tribute to him ahead of the kick-off of the last game of the 2023 Tri-Nation International Tournament.

== Later life and death ==
After leaving Secunderabad permanently, Balaram became resident of Uttarpara, Hooghly. He later worked as senior welfare officer in South Eastern Railway.

On 26 December 2022, he was admitted to a hospital in Kolkata with abdominal distension and other age-related problems. Balaram died on 16 February 2023, at the age of 86.

== International statistics ==
=== International 'A' Matches ===
Date	Venue	Opponent	Result	Competition	Goals
26 May 1958	Korakuen Velodrome, Tokyo	Burma	3–2	1958 Asian Games	1
30 May 1958	Tokyo Football Stadium, Tokyo	Hong Kong	5–2	1958 Asian Games	1
1 June 1958	National Stadium, Tokyo	Indonesia	1–4	1958 Asian Games	1
31 August 1959	Kuala Lumpur, Malaya	Singapore	2–0	1959 Merdeka Tournament	1
14 April 1960	Calcutta, India	Indonesia	4–2	1960 Olympics Qualifier	1
21 August 1960	Rome, Italy	Tunisia	2–2	International Friendly	2
26 August 1960	L'Aquila, Italy	Hungary	1–2	1960 Olympic Games	1
1 September 1960	Pescara, Italy	Peru	1–3	1960 Olympic Games	1
28 August 1962	Senayan Stadium, Jakarta	Thailand	4–1	1962 Asian Games	1
29 August 1962	Senayan Stadium, Jakarta	Japan	2–0	1962 Asian Games	1

== Honours ==
India

- Asian Games Gold medal: 1962
- Merdeka Tournament runner-up: 1959

East Bengal

- IFA Shield: 1958, 1961
- Calcutta Football League: 1961
- Durand Cup: 1960

Hyderabad

- Santosh Trophy: 1956–57

Bengal

- Santosh Trophy: 1958–59, 1959–60, 1962–63

Bengal Nagpur Railway

- IFA Shield: 1963
- Rovers Cup: 1964

Hyderabad City Police/AP Police

- Rovers Cup: 1962

Individual

- Arjuna Award: 1962
- Calcutta Football League top scorer: 1961
- Best Player Award by the Kolkata Veterans Club: 1961
- Banga Bibhushan: 2013
- Sportskeeda All time Indian Football XI

== See also ==
- List of East Bengal Club captains
- History of the India national football team
- India national football team at the Olympics

== Bibliography ==
- Ghosh, Shyam Sundar (September 2022), Balaram: The Hero of Indian Football.
- Majumdar, Boria; Bandyopadhyay, Kausik (2006). A Social History Of Indian Football: Striving To Score. Routledge. ISBN 9780415348355. Archived from the original on 29 June 2021.
- Basu, Jaydeep (2003). Stories from Indian Football. UBS Publishers' Distributors. ISBN 9788174764546. Archived from the original on 11 October 2022.
- Kapadia, Novy (2017). Barefoot to Boots: The Many Lives of Indian Football. Penguin Random House. ISBN 978-0-143-42641-7.
- Martinez, Dolores; Mukharjiim, Projit B (2009). Football: From England to the World: The Many Lives of Indian Football. Routledge. ISBN 978-1-138-88353-6. Archived from the original on 2 July 2022.
- Nath, Nirmal (2011). History of Indian Football: Upto 2009–10. Readers Service. ISBN 9788187891963. Archived from the original on 22 July 2022.
- Dineo, Paul; Mills, James (2001). Soccer in South Asia: Empire, Nation, Diaspora. London, United Kingdom: Frank Cass Publishers. ISBN 978-0-7146-8170-2. Archived from the original on 25 July 2022.
- Sengupta, Somnath (13 July 2011). "Tactical Evolution of Indian Football (Part Two): Revolution Under Rahim Saab". thehardtackle.com. Kolkata: The Hard Tackle. Archived from the original on 25 October 2021.
- "From facing death to playing through pain: The story of Jarnail Singh, Indian football's gutsy hero". scroll.in. Scroll. 25 June 2020. Archived from the original on 30 December 2021.
- Bhattacharya, Ayan (10 September 2023). "বাংলা ভাগের ক্ষত কিভাবে বিষিয়ে দিল মোহনবাগান আর ইস্টবেঙ্গলকে?" [How did the wound of the partition of Bengal poisoned both Mohun Bagan and East Bengal?]. inscript.me (in Bengali). Kolkata: ইনস্ক্রিপ্ট বাংলা নিউজ. Archived from the original on 7 November 2023.
- Bhowmick, Mithun (15 December 2018). "ভারতীয় ফুটবলের অসুখসমূহ: পর্ব – ২" [Diseases of Indian football: Episode – 2]. bengali.indianexpress.com (in Bengali). Kolkata: IE Bangla Sports Desk. Indian Express News Service. Archived from the original on 15 November 2023.
