= India national football team results (1990–1999) =

This article lists the results of India national football team from 1990–1999.

Summary Matches 241–306
Games	Won	Draw	Lost	GF	GA	Win %
66	21	18	27	87	109	31.82%
Biggest win
India 5–1 Maldives 13 September 1997
Biggest defeat
South Korea 7–0 India 9 June 1993
Honours
(gold) 1993 SAFF Championship, Pakistan
(gold) 1995 South Asian Games, India
(gold) 1997 SAFF Championship, Nepal
(gold) 1999 SAFF Championship, India
(silver) 1993 South Asian Games, Bangladesh
(silver) 1995 SAFF Championship, Sri Lanka
(bronze) 1999 South Asian Games, Nepal
← 1980–89				2000–09 →		

Key
Indicates India national football team won the match
Indicates the match ended in draw
Indicates India national football team lost the match

== 1991 ==
17 January 1991
1991 Nehru Cup

India	1–2	Hungary
C. V. Pappachan 43'	Report	Balog 50' (pen.); Jován 75'

Chandrasekharan Nair Stadium, Trivandrum, India
Attendance: 20,000
Referee: Welly Chikuka (Zambia)

22 December 1991
1991 S.A Games

Pakistan	0–0	India
	Report

Sugathadasa Stadium, Colombo, Sri Lanka
Referee: Vichai Charupunt (Thailand)

26 December 1991
1991 S.A Games

Bangladesh	2–1	India
Rumi 20', 75'	Report	Pereira 88'

Sugathadasa Stadium, Colombo, Sri Lanka
Referee: La Thuthu Malla (Maldives)

== 1992 ==
9 May 1992
15:45 IST
1992 AFC Q

India	2–0	Pakistan
Vijayan 3', 81'	Report

Salt Lake Stadium, Calcutta, India

15 May 1992
15:45 IST
1992 AFC Q

Iran	3–0	India
Moharrami 35'; Pious 39', 64'	Report

Salt Lake Stadium, Calcutta, India
Attendance: 20,000
Referee: Mohd. Nazri Abdullah (Malaysia)

== 1993 ==
20 January 1993
16:45 IST
1993 Nehru Cup

India	0–0	Finland
	Report

Jawaharlal Nehru Stadium, Madras, India
Attendance: 10,000
Referee: Sagar Kumar Sen (India)

24 January 1993
1993 Nehru Cup

India	1–1	Cameroon
Vijayan	Report	Djang Maouadjo 46'

Jawaharlal Nehru Stadium, Madras, India

26 January 1993
17:15 IST
1993 Nehru Cup

Finland	2–0	India
Pasi Tauriainen 60'; Rajamäki 61'	Report

Jawaharlal Nehru Stadium, Madras, India
Attendance: 25,000
Referee: Badruddin Badhu Badruddin (Bangladesh)

30 January 1993
1993 Nehru Cup

Cameroon	2–2	India
Kom 11'; Alexis Syalla 20'	Report	Sathyan 49'; Aqeel Ansari 58'

Jawaharlal Nehru Stadium, Madras, India

7 May 1993
1994 FIFA WC Q

Lebanon	2–2	India
Melikyan 37'; Taha 53'	FIFA	Tejinder Kumar 63'; Sathyan 84'

Bourj Hammoud Stadium, Beirut, Lebanon
Attendance: 15,000
Referee: Nizar Watti (Syria)

11 May 1993
1994 FIFA WC Q

India	1–2	Hong Kong
Bhupinder Thakur 54'	Report	Loh Wai Chi 15'; Lee Kin Wo 59'

Bourj Hammoud Stadium, Beirut, Lebanon
Referee: Qazi Asif (Pakistan)

13 May 1993
1994 FIFA WC Q

India	0–3	South Korea
	KFA	Myung-Bo 19' (pen.); Moon-Sik 70'; Seok-Ju 89'

Bourj Hammoud Stadium, Beirut, Lebanon
Attendance: 17,000
Referee: Al-Hindyani (Kuwait)

15 May 1993
1994 FIFA WC Q

Bahrain	2–1	India
Khamis Thani 4'; Ali Saad 31'	Report	V. P. Sathyan 90' (pen.)

Bourj Hammoud Stadium, Beirut, Lebanon
Referee: Qazi Asif (Pakistan)

7 June 1993
1994 FIFA WC Q

India	0–3	Bahrain
	Report	Khamis Mubarak 20', 53'; Khamis Thani 54'

Seoul Olympic Stadium, Seoul, South Korea
Referee: Shariff (Singapore)

9 June 1993
1994 FIFA WC Q

South Korea	7–0	India
Lee Ki-Bum 5', 25', 49'; Kim Tae-Young 37', 70'; Park Jung-bae 39'; Ha Seok-Ju 68'	KFA

Seoul Olympic Stadium, Seoul, South Korea
Attendance: 13,251
Referee: Al-Yenbua'awy (Saudi Arabia)

11 June 1993
1994 FIFA WC Q

India	1–2	Lebanon
Bhupinder Thakur 44'	FIFA	Hassan Ayoub 41'; Rafi Joulfagi 79'

Seoul Olympic Stadium, Seoul, South Korea
Referee: Wei Jihong (China)

13 June 1993
1994 FIFA WC Q

Hong Kong	1–3	India
Wong Chi Keung 66'	FIFA	V. P. Sathyan 6'; I. M. Vijayan 77'; Bhupinder Thakur 52'

Seoul Olympic Stadium, Seoul, South Korea
Referee: Ali (Iraq)

16 July 1993
1993 SAFF Cup

India	2–0	Sri Lanka
I. M. Vijayan; Gunabir Singh	Report

Railway Stadium, Lahore, Pakistan

21 July 1993
1993 SAFF Cup

India	1–0	Nepal
I. M. Vijayan 67'	Report

Railway Stadium, Lahore, Pakistan

23 July 1993
1993 SAFF Cup

Pakistan	1–1	India
Nauman Khan 47'	Report	I. M. Vijayan 90'

Railway Stadium, Lahore, Pakistan
Attendance: 10,000

22 December 1993
1993 S.A Games

India	2–0	Sri Lanka
Tejinder Kumar 74'; Bhupinder Thakur 87'	Report

Dhaka Stadium, Dhaka, Bangladesh
Referee: Ahmed Hakeem Ibrahim (UAE)

24 December 1993
1993 S.A Games

India	2–2	Pakistan
Bhupinder Thakur 43'; Tejinder Kumar 85'	Report	Nauman Khan 49', 58'

Mirpur Stadium, Dhaka, Bangladesh
Referee: Rafiqul Islam (Bangladesh)

26 December 1993
1993 S.A Games Final

Nepal	2–2 (a.e.t.)	India
Umesh Pradhan 65'; Mani Shah 87'	AIFF	Tejinder Kumar 26'; I. M. Vijayan 81'
Penalties
Rajesh Manandhar (penalty scored); Raju Kaji (penalty scored); Mani Shah (penalty scored); Basanta Raj Gurung (penalty scored)	4–3	Sathyan (penalty scored); Subir Ghosh (penalty scored); Bhupinder Thakur (penalty scored); Ansari Ahmed (penalty missed)

Mirpur Stadium, Dhaka, Bangladesh
Referee: Russamee Jindamai (Thailand)

== 1994 ==
14 September 1994 (Note: Bangladesh was represented by the club Muktijoddha Sangsad KC, with three guest players, but the match is considered as full A international by FIFA.)
1994 Qatar Independence Cup

India	4–2	Bangladesh
Pasha 3', 55'; Ancheri 9'; Tejinder Kumar 23'	Report	Nakib 63', 74'

Khalifa International Stadium, Doha, Qatar
Referee: Ibrahim Moos Al-Balushi (Oman)

18 September 1994
1994 Qatar Independence Cup

Yemen	2–0	India
	Report

Khalifa International Stadium, Doha, Qatar

21 September 1994
1994 Qatar Independence Cup

Oman	4–1	India
Saif Said Al-Habsi	Report	Ancheri

Khalifa International Stadium, Doha, Qatar

23 September 1994
1994 Qatar Independence Cup

Yemen	2–0	India
	Report

Khalifa International Stadium, Doha, Qatar

== 1995 ==
10 March 1995
1995 Nehru Cup

India	0–5	Thailand
	Report	Phanuwat Yinphan; Kovid Foythong; Somrrit Ornsomjit; Cherdai Suwannang

Salt Lake Stadium, Calcutta, India

12 March 1995
1995 Nehru Cup

India	1–1	Iraq
Tauzif Jamal	Report	Obeid 20'

Salt Lake Stadium, Calcutta, India

29 March 1995
1995 SAFF Championship

India	2–2	Sri Lanka
Bhutia 25', 27'	Report	Amanulla 62', 87' (pen.)

Sugathadasa Stadium, Colombo, Sri Lanka
Referee: Mansur Mohammed Abul Azad (Bangladesh)

29 March 1995
1995 SAFF Championship Semifinal

India	0–0 (a.e.t.)	Bangladesh
	Report
Penalties
	4–2

Sugathadasa Stadium, Colombo, Sri Lanka

29 March 1995
1995 SAFF Championship Final

Sri Lanka	1–0 (a.s.d.e.t.)	India
Sarath Wellage 108'	Report

Sugathadasa Stadium, Colombo, Sri Lanka

23 December 1995
South Asian Games

India	1–0	Sri Lanka
Vijayan	Report

Jawaharlal Nehru Stadium, Madras, India

25 December 1995
South Asian Games

India	3–0	Nepal
Vijayan; Chapman	Report

Jawaharlal Nehru Stadium, Madras, India

27 December 1995
South Asian Games

India	1–0	Bangladesh
Pasha	Report

Jawaharlal Nehru Stadium, Madras, India

== 1996 ==
4 March 1996
1996 AFC Asian Cup qualification

Indonesia	7–1	India
Indriyanto 12', 74'; Rochy 18', 52'; Ansyari 42', 49'; Peri 77'	Report	Tejinder Kumar 11'

Shah Alam Stadium, Kuala Lumpur, Malaysia

6 March 1996
1996 AFC Asian Cup qualification

Malaysia	5–2	India
Abidin 12', 57'; Salleh 21' (pen.), 54'; Abu Bakar 71'	Report	Chapman 46'; Bhutia 78'

Shah Alam Stadium, Kuala Lumpur, Malaysia

21 September 1996
1998 FIFA World Cup Qualifier

India	2–0	Philippines
R. Vijayan 81'; Coutinho 85'	FIFA

Khalifa International Stadium, Doha, Qatar
Attendance: 700
Referee: Omar Ali Al Shughair (Saudi Arabia)

24 September 1996
1998 FIFA World Cup Qualifier

Sri Lanka	1–1	India
Silva 14'	FIFA	Chapman 39'

Khalifa International Stadium, Doha, Qatar
Attendance: 400
Referee: Ammar Ammar (Lebanon)

27 September 1996
1998 FIFA World Cup Qualifier

Qatar	6–0	India
Al-Enazi 27', 40'; Zamel Al Kuwari 42'; Maayof 47'; Soufi 52'; Fazli 61'	Report

Khalifa International Stadium, Doha, Qatar
Attendance: 3,000
Referee: Omar Ali Al Shughair (Saudi Arabia)

== 1997 ==
1 April 1997 (Note: The match against China B is considered as Full A international by AIFF and other sources.)
1997 Nehru Cup

India	0–0	China
	Report

Jawaharlal Nehru Stadium, Kochi, India

6 April 1997
1997 Nehru Cup

India	0–1	Iraq
	Report	Chathir 24'

Jawaharlal Nehru Stadium, Kochi, India
Attendance: 25,000

10 April 1997
1997 Nehru Cup, Semifinal

Iraq	1–1 (a.e.t.)	India
Saadoun 74'	Report	Chapman 29'
Penalties
	4–2

Jawaharlal Nehru Stadium, Kochi, India
Attendance: 60,000

11 April 1997 (Note: The match against China B is considered as Full A international by AIFF and other FIFA.)
1997 Nehru Cup

China	2–1	India
Bao Wen Jie; Yong	Report	Bhutia

Jawaharlal Nehru Stadium, Kochi, India
Attendance: 18,500

7 September 1997
1997 SAFF Championship

India	3–0	Bangladesh
Vijayan 74', 76'; Bhutia 88'	Report

Dasharath Rangasala, Kathmandu, Nepal

9 September 1997
1997 SAFF Championship

India	2–2	Maldives
Bhutia 30'; Ancheri 55'	Report	Ibrahim Rasheed 65'; Nizam 83'

Dasharath Rangasala, Kathmandu, Nepal

11 September 1997
1997 SAFF Championship, Semifinal

India	2–0	Pakistan
Vijayan 42', 76'	Report

Dasharath Rangasala, Kathmandu, Nepal

13 September 1997
1997 SAFF Championship, Final

India	5–1	Maldives
Ancheri 9'; Bhutia 15'; Vijayan 20', 53'; Amit Das 49'	Report	Adam Abdul Lateef 43'

Dasharath Rangasala, Kathmandu, Nepal

== 1998 ==
16 November 1998
Friendly

India	0–0	Uzbekistan
	Report

Ambedkar Stadium, New Delhi, India

19 November 1998
Friendly

India	0–4	Uzbekistan
	Report	Khvostunov 8'; Lebedev 30' (pen.); Kutibayev 35'; Gafurov 48'

Salt Lake Stadium, Kolkata, India

5 December 1998
15:30 ICT
1998 Asian Games First Round

India	1–0	Nepal
Chapman 46'	Report

Trang Stadium, Trang, Thailand

7 December 1998
15:00 ICT
1998 Asian Games Second Round

Turkmenistan	3–2	India
Neželew 39'; Agaýew 49'; Kislow 74'	Report	Vijayan 83'; Rakshit 87'

Supachalasai Stadium, Bangkok, Thailand

9 December 1998
17:00 ICT
1998 Asian Games Second Round

India	0–2	Uzbekistan
	Report	Shkvyrin 35'; Rahmonqulov 49'

Supachalasai Stadium, Bangkok, Thailand

11 December 1998
15:00 ICT
1998 Asian Games Second Round

India	0–2	North Korea
	Report	So Min-chol 11'; Ju Song-il 73'

Supachalasai Stadium, Bangkok, Thailand

== 1999 ==
22 April 1999
1999 SAFF Championship

India	0–0	Bangladesh
	Report

Fatorda Stadium, Goa, India

26 April 1999
1999 SAFF Championship

India	2–0	Pakistan
Bhutia 23'; Pasha 87'	Report

Fatorda Stadium, Goa, India

29 April 1999
1999 SAFF Championship, Semifinal

Maldives	1–2	India
Wildhan 43'	Report	Bhutia 30'; Coutinho 84'

Fatorda Stadium, Goa, India

1 May 1999
1999 SAFF Championship, Final

Bangladesh	0–2	India
	Report	Coutinho 26'; Bhutia 44'

Fatorda Stadium, Goa, India

26 September 1999
1999 South Asian Games

India	5–2	Pakistan
Jules Alberto Dias 8'; Pasha 12'; Vijayan 52', 61', 73' (pen.)	Report	Yousaf 76'; Zaman 90+1'

Dasharath Rangasala, Kathmandu, Nepal
Referee: Georgios Fassolis (Greece)

30 September 1999
1999 South Asian Games

India	4–0	Nepal
Jules Alberto Dias 4', 45'; Hardeep Singh 29'; Majeeb Moolanchikkal 48'	Report

Dasharath Rangasala, Kathmandu, Nepal
Referee: Georgios Fassolis (Greece)

2 October 1999
1999 South Asian Games, Semifinal

India	0–1	Bangladesh
	Report	Shahajuddin Tipu 64'

Dasharath Rangasala, Kathmandu, Nepal

4 October 1999
1999 South Asian Games, Bronze Medal Match

India	3–1	Maldives
I. M. Vijayan 17'; Pasha 86'; R. Vijayan 89'	Report	Abdul Ghafoor 9'

Dasharath Rangasala, Kathmandu, Nepal

20 November 1999
2000 AFC Asian Cup qualification

United Arab Emirates	3–1	India
Al Kass 60', 85'; Jumaa 90' (pen.)	Report	Vijayan 21'

Tahnoun bin Mohammed Stadium, Abu Dhabi, UAE

24 November 1999
2000 AFC Asian Cup qualification

India	2–3	Uzbekistan
Ancheri 18'; Vijayan 55'	Report	Shukhrat Rakhmanqulov 17'; Fyodorov 77'; Shirshov 86'

Tahnoun bin Mohammed Stadium, Abu Dhabi, UAE

26 November 1999
2000 AFC Asian Cup qualification

Sri Lanka	1–3	India
Isuru Perera 65'	Report	Basudeb Mondal 24'; R. Singh 40'; Pasha 76'

Tahnoun bin Mohammed Stadium, Abu Dhabi, UAE

28 November 1999
2000 AFC Asian Cup qualification

India	2–2	Bangladesh
Vijayan 25'; Jules Alberto Dias 50'	Report	Alfaz Ahmed 19', 49'

Tahnoun bin Mohammed Stadium, Abu Dhabi, UAE

== Opponents ==
Team	Pld	W	D	L	GF	GA	GD
Bangladesh	9	4	3	2	13	7	+6
Bahrain	2	0	0	2	1	5	–4
Cameroon	2	0	2	0	3	3	0
China	2	0	1	1	1	2	–1
Finland	2	0	1	1	0	2	–2
Hong Kong	2	1	0	1	4	3	+1
Hungary	1	0	0	1	1	2	–1
Indonesia	1	0	0	1	1	7	–6
Iran	1	0	0	1	0	3	–3
Iraq	3	0	2	1	2	3	–1
Lebanon	2	0	1	1	3	4	–1
Malaysia	1	0	0	1	2	5	–3
Maldives	4	3	1	0	12	5	+7
Nepal	5	4	1	0	11	2	+9
North Korea	1	0	0	1	0	2	–2
Oman	1	0	0	1	1	4	–3
Pakistan	7	4	3	0	14	5	+9
Philippines	1	1	0	0	2	0	+2
Qatar	1	0	0	1	0	6	–6
South Korea	2	0	0	2	0	10	–10
Sri Lanka	7	4	2	1	11	5	+6
Thailand	1	0	0	1	0	5	–5
Turkmenistan	1	0	0	1	2	3	–1
United Arab Emirates	1	0	0	1	1	3	–2
Uzbekistan	4	0	1	3	2	9	–7
Yemen	2	0	0	2	0	4	–4
Total	66	21	18	27	87	109	–22

== See also ==
- Unofficial games of India in 1990s
- Indian women's national football team results (1990–1999)
- India national football team results (1980–1989)
- India national football team results (2000–2009)
- History of the India national football team
