= History of the India national football team =

The history of the India national football team dates back to the 1920s. They have never played in the World Cup although they qualified in 1950. They have had no entries in the tournament since 1950. Indian football team won the Asian Games in 1951 in New Delhi, against Iran and in 1962 Against South Korea. India finished as runners up at the 1964 AFC Asian Cup. They have only made four appearances in the tournament since then.

== Early years ==
The first known official international tour of the Indian team which at that time consisted of both Indian and British players was in 1924, when it was led by legendary Indian footballer Gostha Pal. Football teams consisting of entirely Indian players started to tour Australia, Japan, Indonesia, and Thailand during the late 1930s. The first international match India played before independence is yet to be verified, but the very trace of it can be found in the match India played overseas against Ceylon in 1933. It was India's second international tour, where Gostha Pal led his side to victory by 1–0 score. On 4 July 1936 India played against visiting Chinese team, which was held at Kolkata. The match was a draw of 1–1. After the success of several Indian football clubs abroad, the All India Football Federation (AIFF) was formed in 1937.

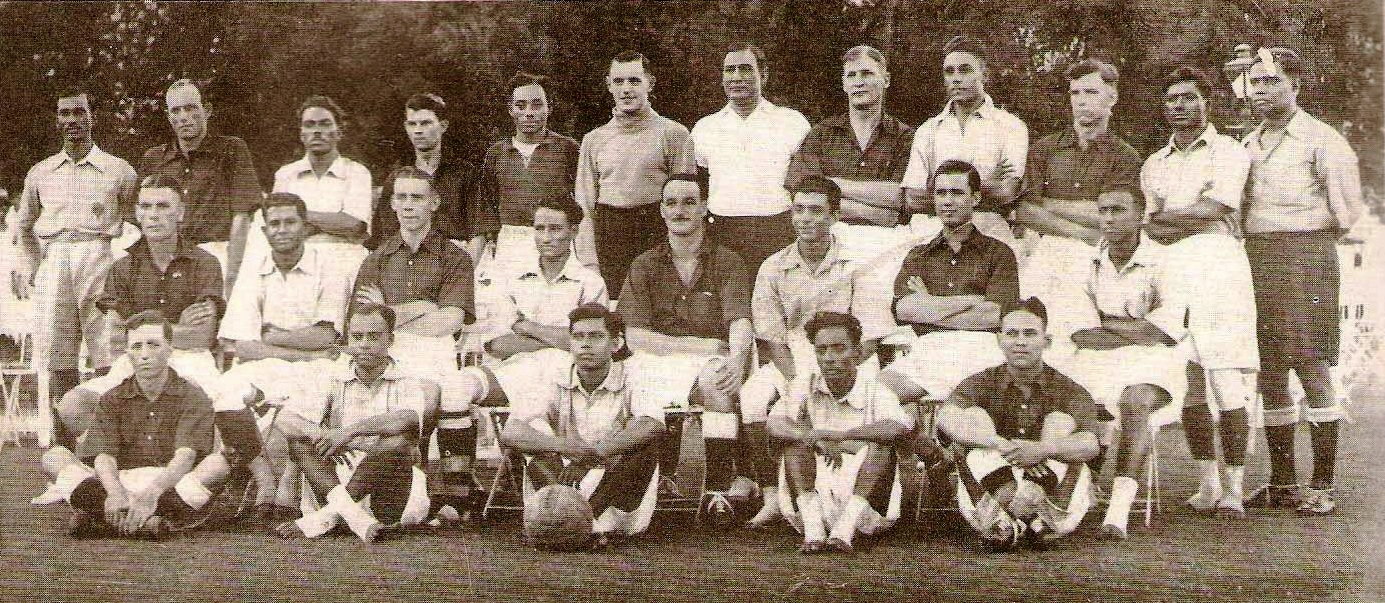
Indian(in white) and all European(in black) team together before 1 July 1938 Calcutta match.

In July 1938, Indian team led by Karuna Bhattacharya, played an international charity match against a visiting all European team at Calcutta, where the European side won by a solitary goal. In the same year, India made a long official tour on invitation by Australian Football Association, from August to October where they played 17 matches against many states, districts, club teams and 5 friendly matches against the Australian national side too. The Indian side was managed by Pankaj Gupta and led by Karuna Bhattacharya and the team was considered as an attacking side, consisted of A Rahim, Pram Lal, Jumma Khan, C Robello, B Sen, R.Lumsden, Noor Mohammed, A Nandi, K Prosad, who was dubbed as "Mickey the mouse" by the Australian media for his skills and electric speed at the right wing and the goal was kept by K.Dutt. After playing some matches against state and district teams, on 3 September at Sydney, India played the first friendly match against Australia and got defeated by 5–3 and the match is considered as India's first FIFA-recognised match. Second match was at Brisbane, where the Indians fought back for a draw of 4–4. In the third match at Newcastle, on 17 September India registered their first win by a margin of 4–1. But the Australians defeated India in the next two matches held at Sydney and Melbourne with a score line of 5–4 and 3–1 respectively. At the Sydney match on 24 September, Indian striker Lumsden scored the first hat-trick for India against the Australian side which includes a penalty kick.

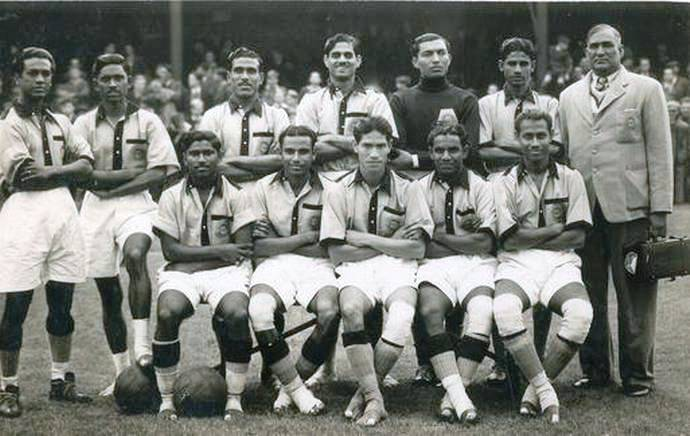
Indian team at 1948 Olympics, T. Ao at the centre of first row, goal scorer S. Raman next to Ao and coach Balaidas Chatterjee to the extreme right.

On their way to 1948 London Olympics, Chinese team again visited India, where they played Mohammedan SC, East Bengal, and Mohun Bagan then finally on 17 July 1948, a friendly match held at Kolkata, where they were defeated by the India national side by a score of 1–0. The 1948 London Olympics was India's first major international tournament, where a predominately barefooted Indian team lost 2–1 to France, failing to convert two penalties. The Indian team was greeted and appreciated by the crowd for their sporting manner. "The French had been given a run for their money – and that, too, by the barefooted Indians!", the British media expressed. At a press conference, shortly after, the Indians were asked why they played barefooted. The ever witty then Indian captain Talimeren Ao said, "Well, you see, we play football in India, whereas you play BOOTBALL!" which was applauded by the British. The next day, that comment was splashed in the newspapers of London.

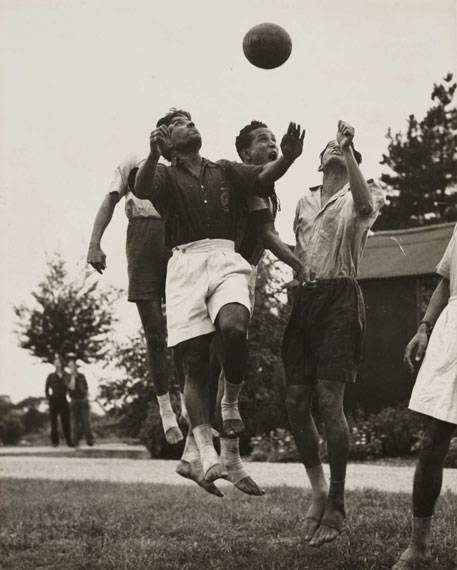
Indian team practising at Richmond park, London in barefoot as the weather was dry

Most players opted to play without shoes and instead wore bandages to protect their feet though fine weather, out of 11 players who took the field eight players were bootless and three were in boots. Sarangapani Raman scored the only goal for India in that match and thus the first Indian international goal ever in the Olympics.

While the 1–2 loss to France and first round elimination was a huge disappointment to the team and the public alike, the quality of football that the team displayed had captivated one and all. Indian footballers’ bravery and brilliance in bare feet at the 1948 Olympics earned them no less a fan than Princess Margaret, the younger sister of Queen Elizabeth II. So much so that King George VI invited the team to Buckingham Palace and there, as the story goes, he lifted up Sailen Manna's trouser leg, telling him it was just to check if the Indian really had legs of steel as would appear from the strength of his shots! But there was football still to be played. Encouraged by the accolades and the positive reception to India's football, the AIFF decided to extend the tour with some friendlies across Europe. Over the next several weeks the team would play some matches that would only enhance its growing reputation. In the Netherlands India lost 1–2 against Sparta Rotterdam but stunned Ajax Amsterdam led by legendary Rinus Michels by 5–1, two days later. Back in England and Wales, it put together a string of victories over several teams including Boldmere St. Michaels F.C., which it met on a muddy pitch at Church Road Ground on 31 August 1948, a day with heavy rainfall. The Indian team was forced to wear boots and a lone goal from B.N. Vajravelu handed India a 1−0 win, with this ended the Europe tour of 1948, a great summer for Indian football history.

== 1950s to 1960s ==
In 1950, India managed to qualify for the 1950 FIFA World Cup finals, which was scheduled to take place in Brazil; where it was drawn with Sweden, Italy, and Paraguay. This was not due to any success on the pitch, but due to the fact that all their opponents during the qualifying round, withdrew from the pre-tournament qualifiers. However, India themselves withdrew from the World Cup finals before the tournament was to begin. The All India Football Federation gave various reasons for the team's withdrawal, including travel costs, lack of practice time, and valuing the Olympics above the World Cup.

Despite the reason given out from the AIFF, many football historians and pundits have repeated the tale that India withdrew from the World Cup due to FIFA imposing a rule banning players from playing barefoot. FIFA offered to pay the travel expenses of the Indian team hence India withdrawing due to travel costs is incorrect. Since then, India has not come close to qualifying for another World Cup.

Despite not participating in the World Cup in 1950, the following years after, from 1951 to 1964, are usually considered to be the "golden era" of Indian football. India, coached by Hyderabad City Police head coach Syed Abdul Rahim, became one of the best teams in Asia. The next year India went back to the Olympics but were once again defeated in the first round, this time by Yugoslavia and by a score of 10–1. Upon returning to India, the AIFF made it mandatory for footballers to wear boots. After taking the defeat in Finland, India participated in various minor tournaments, such as the Asian Quadrangular Football Tournament, which they won four times from 1952 to 1955.

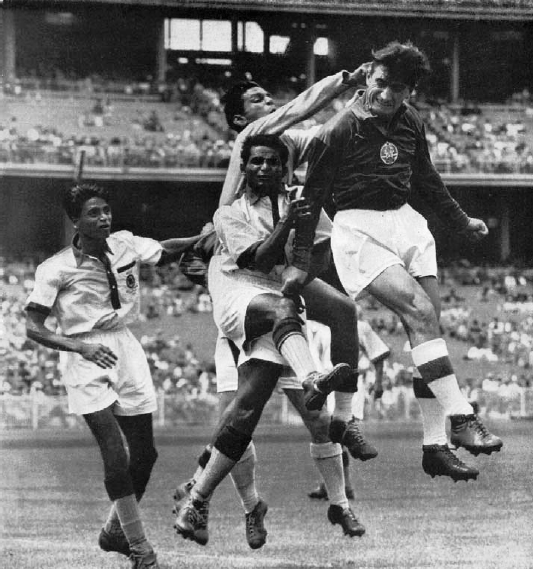
Indian team at a melee against Australia at 1956 Olympics.

In 1954, India returned to the Asian Games as defending champions in Manila. Despite their achievement three years prior, India were unable to go past the group stage as the team finished second in Group C during the tournament, two points behind Indonesia. Two years later, during the 1956 Summer Olympics, India went on to achieve the team's greatest result in a competitive tournament. The team finished in fourth place during the Summer Olympics football tournament, losing the bronze-medal match to Bulgaria 3–0. The tournament is also known for Neville D'Souza's hat-trick against Australia in the quarterfinals. D'Souza's hat-trick was the first hat-trick scored by an Asian in Olympic history and he was the highest goal scorer in that edition of the games along with Todor Veselinović of Yugoslavia and Dimitar Milanov of Bulgaria, 4 goals scored by each.

After their good performance during the Summer Olympics, India participated in the 1958 Asian Games in Tokyo. The team once again finished fourth, losing the bronze-medal match to Indonesia 4–1. The next year the team traveled to Malaysia where they took part in the Merdeka Cup and finished as the tournament runners-up.

India began the 1960s with 1960 AFC Asian Cup qualifiers. Despite the qualifiers for the West Zone being held in Kochi, India finished last in their qualification group and thus failed to qualify for the tournament. Despite the set-back, India went on to win the gold medal during the Asian Games for the second time in 1962. The team defeated South Korea 2–1 to win their second major championship.

To qualify for the 1960 Summer Olympics, India took part in the qualification round were in the first round, they defeated Afghanistan in the 1st leg by 5–2, and withdrew from the 2nd, India proceeded to the second round where they defeated Indonesia in both legs by 4–2 & 2–0, they qualified for 1960 Summer Olympics which is their last until now. At that edition, India again failed to proceed from the first round, where they saw two defeats of 2–1 & 3–1 by Hungary, Peru and a draw against France of 1–1.

Two years later, following their Asian Games triumph, India participated in the 1964 AFC Asian Cup after all the other teams in their qualification group withdrew. This was India's first Asian Cup appearance. Despite their automatic entry into the continental tournament, India managed to finish as the runners-up during the tournament, losing out to the hosts, Israel, by two points. This remains India's best performance in the AFC Asian Cup. India returned to the Asian Games in 1966. Despite their performance two years prior during the AFC Asian Cup, India could not go beyond the group stage as the team finished third, behind Japan and Iran.

== 1970s to 1990s ==
Four years later to 1966 Asian Games, India participated at the 1970 Asian Games, where they came back and took third place during the tournament. The team defeated Japan 1–0 during the bronze-medal match.

In 1974, India's performance in the Asian Games once again sharply declined as they finished the 1974 edition in last place in their group, losing all three matches, scoring two, and conceding 14 goals in the first round. India then showed steady improvement during the 1978 tournament, finishing second in their group of three. The team were then knocked-out in the next round, finishing last in their group with three defeats from three matches. The 1982 tournament proved to be better for India as the side managed to qualify for the quarter-finals before losing to Saudi Arabia 1–0.

In 1984, India managed to qualify for the AFC Asian Cup for the first time since their second place triumph in 1964. During the 1984 tournament, India finished in last place in their five team group in the first round. India's only non-defeat during the tournament came against Iran, a 0–0 draw.

Despite India's decline from a major football power in Asia, the team still managed to assert its dominance as the top team in South Asia. India managed to win the football competition of the South Asian Games in 1985 and then again won the gold medal in 1987. The team then began the 1990s by winning the inaugural SAFF Championship in 1993. The team ended the 20th century by winning the SAFF Championship again in 1997 and 1999.

== 2000–2009 ==
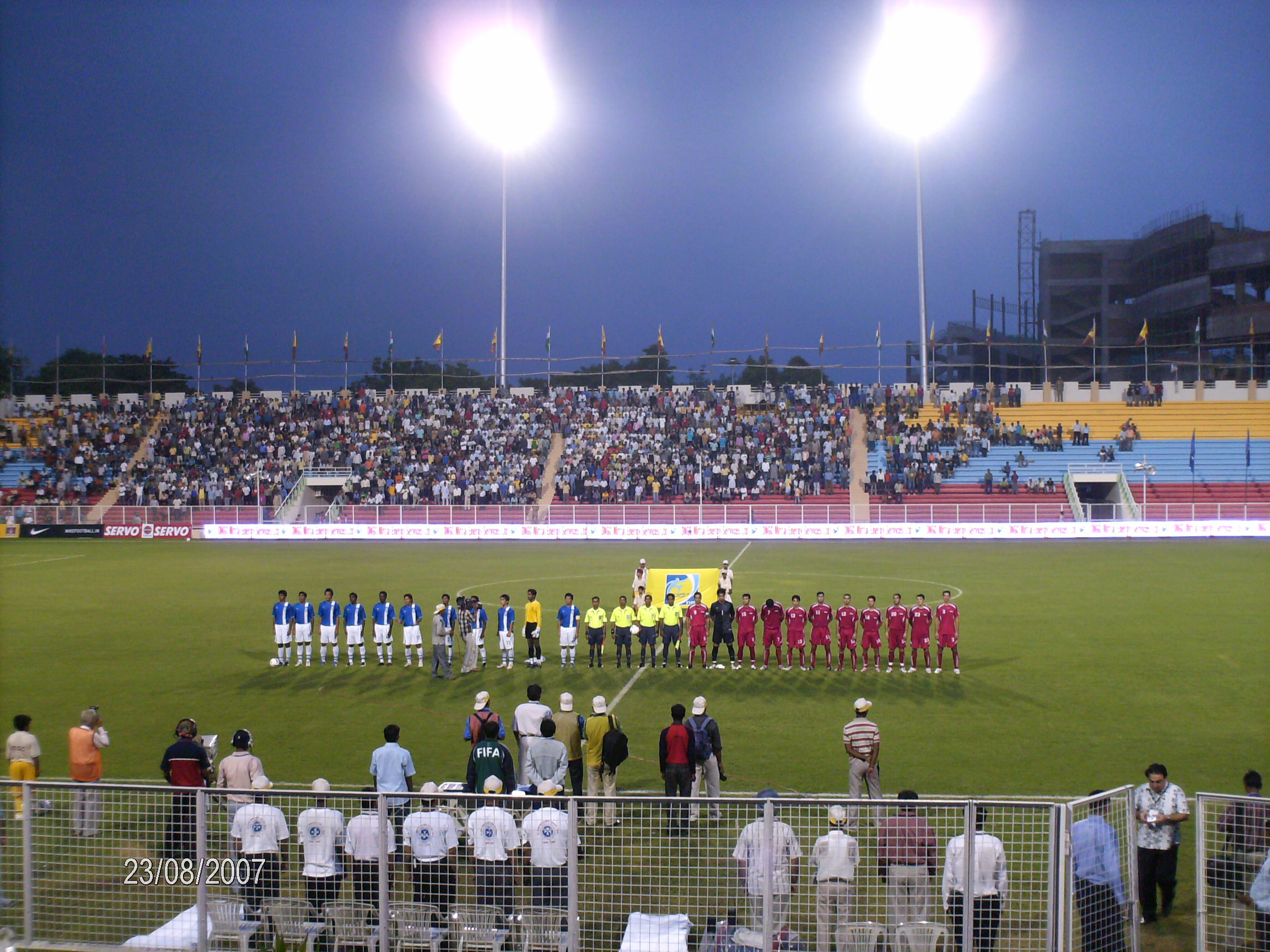
2007 Nehru Cup final, India vs Syria at the Ambedkar Stadium in New Delhi

India's first competitive matches of the 21st century were the 2002 FIFA World Cup first round qualifiers. Despite a very bright start, defeating the United Arab Emirates 1–0, drawing Yemen 1–1, as well as two victories over Brunei, including a 5–0 victory in Bangalore, India finished a point away from qualification for the next round. In 2003, India took part in the 2003 SAFF Championship. The team qualified for the semi-finals but fell to Bangladesh 2–1.

Later in 2003, India participated in the Afro-Asian Games being held in Hyderabad. Under the coaching of Stephen Constantine, India managed to make it to the final of the tournament after defeating Zimbabwe, a team ranked 85 places above India in the FIFA rankings at the time, 5–3. Despite the major victory, during the gold-medal match India were defeated 1–0 by Uzbekistan U21. Due to this achievement, Constantine was voted as the Asian Football Confederation's Manager of the Month for October 2003. The tournament result also gave India more recognition around the country and around the world.

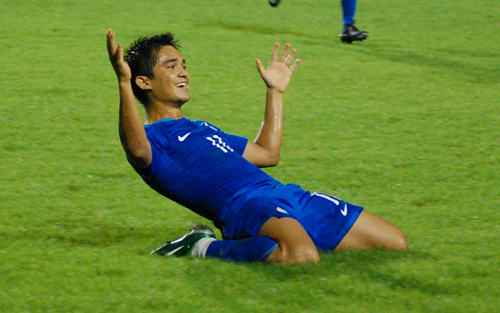
Sunil Chhetri celebrating after scoring during the 2008 AFC Challenge Cup.

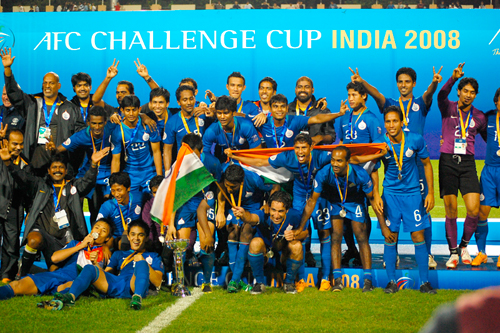
India celebrating after winning the 2008 AFC Challenge Cup.

Constantine was replaced by Syed Nayeemuddin in 2005 but the Indian head coach only lasted for a little over a year as India suffered many heavy defeats during the 2007 AFC Asian Cup qualifiers. During this time India were defeated 6–0 by Japan, 3–0 by Saudi Arabia and Yemen respectively at home, and 7–1 away in Jeddah. Former Malmö and China coach Bob Houghton was brought in as head coach in May 2006.

Under Houghton, India witnessed massive improvement in their football standing. In August 2007, Houghton won the country the restarted Nehru Cup after India defeated Syria 1–0 in the final. Pappachen Pradeep scored the winning goal for India that match. The next year, Houghton lead India during the 2008 AFC Challenge Cup, which was hosted in Hyderabad and Delhi. During the tournament, India breezed through the group stage before defeating Myanmar in the semi-finals. In the final against Tajikistan, India, through a Sunil Chhetri hat-trick, won the match 4–1. The victory not only earned India the championship but it also allowed India to qualify for the 2011 AFC Asian Cup, the nation's first Asian Cup appearance in 27 years. In order to prepare for the Asian Cup, Houghton had the team stay together as a squad for eight months from June 2010 until the start of the tournament, meaning the players would not play for their clubs.

India were drawn into Group C for the Asian Cup with Australia, South Korea, and Bahrain. Despite staying together as a team for eight months, India lost all three of their matches during the Asian Cup, including a 4–0 defeat to Australia. Despite the results, India were still praised by fans and pundits for their valiant efforts during the tournament.

== 2010–2019 ==
=== AFC Asian Cup ===
In 2011, India started off their campaign by participating in 2011 AFC Asian Cup for which they qualified after 24 years. They were placed in strong Group C along with South Korea, Australia and Bahrain. India lost all three matches but did manage to perform well in patches. Goalkeeper Subrata Pal won a lot of accolades for his performances.

Team	Pld	W	D	L	GF	GA	GD	Pts
Australia	3	2	1	0	6	1	+5	7
South Korea	3	2	1	0	7	3	+4	7
Bahrain	3	1	0	2	6	5	+1	3
India	3	0	0	3	3	13	−10	0

10 January 2011	India	0 – 4	Australia	Jassim Bin Hamad Stadium, Doha
16:15			Cahill 11', 65'; Kewell 24'; Holman 45+1'	Attendance: 11,749; Referee: Ali Al Badwawi (UAE)

14 January 2011	Bahrain	5 – 2	India	Jassim Bin Hamad Stadium, Doha
19:15	Aaish 8' (pen.); Abdullatif 16', 19', 36', 77'		Gouramangi 9'; Chhetri 52'	Attendance: 11,032; Referee: Subkhiddin Mohd Salleh (Malaysia)

18 January 2011	South Korea	4 – 1	India	Al Gharafa Stadium, Doha
16:15	Ji Dong-Won 6'; Koo Ja-Cheol 9'; Ji Dong-Won 23'; Son Heung-Min 81'		Chhetri 12' (pen.)	Attendance: 11,366; Referee: Khalil Al Ghamdi (Saudi Arabia)

=== After 2011 Asian Cup ===
After participating the 2011 AFC Asian Cup, India's quest to qualify for the 2015 edition of the tournament began in February 2011 with AFC Challenge Cup qualifiers. Bob Houghton decided to change the makeup of the India squad, replacing many of the aging players from the Asian Cup with some young players from the AIFF development side in the I-League, Indian Arrows. Even with a young side, India managed to qualify for the AFC Challenge Cup with ease. Despite the good result though with a young side, the AIFF decided to terminate the contract of Bob Houghton. India played its first match in 2012 AFC Challenge Cup qualification on 21 March winning 3–0 against Chinese Taipei, with Jewel Raja Shaikh, Sunil Chhetri and Jeje Lalpekhlua scoring the goals. On 23 March they faced Pakistan. India came from behind and defeated Pakistan 3–1 with Jeje Lalpekhlua scoring 2 goals and Steven Dias scoring one. On 25 March they faced Turkmenistan in their last 2012 AFC Challenge Cup qualifying game and. India drew the game 1–1. The result meant that they finished on top of Group B and qualified for the 2012 AFC Challenge Cup. After having Dempo coach, Armando Colaco, as interim head coach, the AIFF signed Savio Medeira as head coach in October 2011. Despite leading India to another SAFF Championship victory, Medeira lead India to their worst performance in the AFC Challenge Cup in March 2012. The team lost all three of their group matches, unable to score a single goal during the tournament. After the tournament, Medeira was replaced as head coach by Dutchman, Wim Koevermans. Koeverman's first job as head coach was the 2012 Nehru Cup. India won their third successive Nehru Cup, defeating Cameroon side on penalties. By March 2015, after not playing any matches, India reached their lowest FIFA ranking position of 173. A couple months prior, Stephen Constantine was re-hired as the head coach after first leading India more than a decade before. Constantine's first major assignment back as the India head coach were the 2018 FIFA World Cup qualifiers. After making it through the first round of qualifiers, India crashed out during the second round, losing seven of their eight matches and thus, once again, failed to qualify for the World Cup.

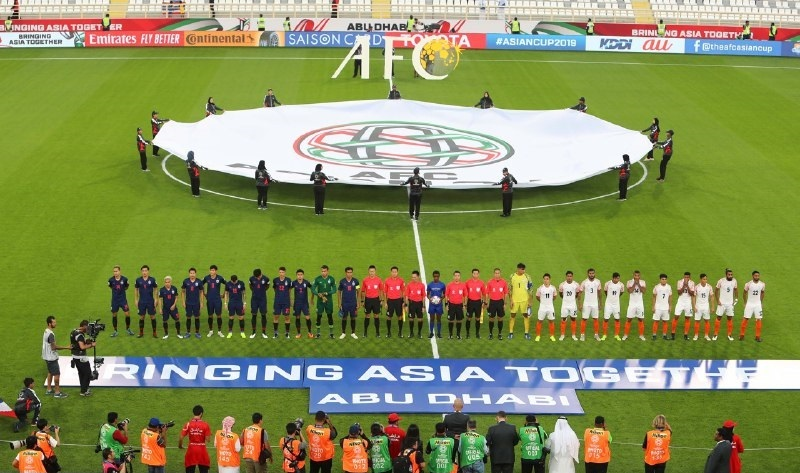
India against Thailand at 2019 AFC Asian Cup.

Despite failure to qualify for the World Cup, India managed to reach the third round of 2019 AFC Asian Cup qualifiers after defeating Laos in the play-off round on aggregate 7–1. On 11 October 2017, India secured qualification for the 2019 AFC Asian Cup after a 4–1 victory over Macau.

India regained the momentum with some friendlies against China, Jordan and Oman as they began the 2019 AFC Asian Cup with a 4–1 victory against Thailand and is the biggest ever Asia cup win for the team and its first one in 55 years. Nevertheless, they lost both of their next two group matches against UAE and Bahrain by 0−2 and 0−1 respectively and finished at the bottom of the group, thus failed to move to knock out stage. Stephen Constantine immediately resigned from his position as head coach following the failure to progress further in the tournament.

6 January Asian Cup G.S.	Thailand	1–4	India	Abu Dhabi, United Arab Emirates
19:00 IST	Dangda 33'	AFC AIFF	Chhetri 27' (pen.), 46'; Thapa 68'; Lalpekhlua 80'	Stadium: Al Nahyan Stadium; Attendance: 3,250; Referee: Liu Kwok Man (Hong Kong)

10 January Asian Cup G.S.	India	0–2	United Arab Emirates	Abu Dhabi, United Arab Emirates
21:30 IST		AFC AIFF	Khalf. Mubarak 41'; Mabkhout 88'	Stadium: Zayed Sports City Stadium; Attendance: 43,206; Referee: César Arturo Ramos (Mexico)

14 January Asian Cup G.S.	India	0–1	Bahrain	Sharjah, United Arab Emirates
21:30 IST		AFC AIFF	Rashid 90+1' (pen.)	Stadium: Sharjah Stadium; Attendance: 11,417; Referee: Ilgiz Tantashev (Uzbekistan)

On 15 May 2019, the AIFF announced former Croatian player Igor Štimac as the team's head coach after the departure of Constantine. Under his coaching India's first campaign was 2019 King's Cup where the first match was against Curaçao, which ended up as 3−1 loss. In that match Štimac had given six players their international debut. In the next match against the host Thailand they managed a 1−0 victory acquiring the third place in the tournament. Štimac's major campaign with India was 2022 World Cup qualification, with a 1–2 home loss to Oman. But in the second match they earned a respectable point after managing a goalless draw against the 2019 Asian Champion and 2022 FIFA World Cup host Qatar. However, in the third match, the home leg against Bangladesh saw them managing a disappointing 1−1 draw. A similar result was repeated in the away leg against Afghanistan. In the away leg, India lost yet again to Oman by a solitary goal, thus shortening their hopes to qualify for the next round. After several postponements due to COVID-19, the team finally flew to Doha to play their remainder of games. In the return leg against Qatar, India went down to the hosts with a single goal and got knocked out of the World Cup qualification tournament with two games to spare. The team then made a comeback by winning their next match against Bangladesh with 2–0, and ended their campaign with a 1–1 draw against Afghanistan. With seven points in total, India finished third on the table behind Qatar and Oman, thus getting eliminated from the World Cup during the second round. However they were qualified into the third round of 2023 AFC Asian Cup qualification.

In the third round of the 2023 AFC Asian Cup qualification, India was drawn in the same group with Afghanistan, Hong Kong and Cambodia. Due to the COVID-19 pandemic, India was chosen as the host of the group of the qualifiers while the qualification was reduced into a single round robin format. Using this home advantage, India was able to top the group with three wins against Cambodia (2–0), Afghanistan (2–1) and Hong Kong (4–0), therefore for the first time, India qualified for two consecutive AFC Asian Cups in history. In September 2022, India participated for the first time in the VFF Cup where they played two friendly matches, a 1–1 draw against Singapore and a 3–0 defeat by Vietnam. In 2023, India won the 2023 Tri-Nation Series and the 2023 Intercontinental Cup, both were organised by AIFF. India beat Myanmar by 1–0 and Kyrgyzstan by 2–0 in the Tri-Nation series. India registered two victory against Mongolia and Vanuatu and a draw against Lebanon, before facing Lebanon again in the final of Intercontinental Cup and defeated them by 2–0 to win the title for the second time.

Following the Tri-Nation Series and the Intercontinental Cup, India won the 2023 SAFF championship, their third title in the year 2023 at home soil. India defeated Pakistan 4–0 and Nepal 2–0 and drawn 1–1 against Kuwait in the group stage. After defeating Lebanon in penalty shoot-out in the semi–finals, India faced Kuwait again in the tournament for the final. The match was tied 1–1 till the added time and eventually India defeated Kuwait in the penalty shoot-out to lift the SAFF Cup for a record nine times. Sunil Chhetri was the highest goal scorer in the tournament with 5 goals, including a hat-trick against Pakistan, his fourth for the national team. With this hat-trick he scored 92 international goals, becoming the second-highest international goalscorer from Asia of all time. His tally of 92 puts him as the fourth-highest goalscorer in the history of international football.

== Home stadiums ==
India national football team home stadiums
Image	Stadium	Capacity	Location	Last match
	Jawaharlal Nehru Stadium	60,254	Pragati Vihar, New Delhi	v Cameroon (31 August 2012; 2012 Nehru Cup)
	Salt Lake Stadium	85,000	Salt Lake, Greater Kolkata, West Bengal	v Kuwait (6 June 2024; 2026 FIFA World Cup qualification)
	Kalinga Stadium	12,000	Bidyut Marg, Bhubaneshwar, Odisha	v Qatar (21 November 2023; 2026 FIFA World Cup qualification)
	Indira Gandhi Athletic Stadium	25,000	Sarusajai, Guwahati, Assam	v Oman (5 September 2019; 2022 FIFA World Cup qualification)
	TransStadia	20,000	Kankaria Lake, Ahmedabad, Gujarat	v Syria (16 July 2019; Intercontinental Cup)
	Mumbai Football Arena	18,000	Andheri West, Mumbai, Maharashtra	v Kenya (10 Jun 2018; Intercontinental Cup; Final)
	Fatorda Stadium	19,000	Fatorda, Margão, Goa	v Myanmar (14 November 2017; Asian Cup qualifier)
	Sree Kanteerava Stadium	25,810	Bangalore, Karnataka	v Kuwait (4 July 2023; 2023 SAFF Championship)
	Jawaharlal Nehru Stadium	41,000	Kaloor, Kochi, Kerala	v Turkmenistan (29 March 2016; World Cup Qualifier)
	Greenfield International Stadium	50,000	Thiruvananthapuram, Kerala	v Afghanistan (3 January 2016; 2015 SAFF Championship Final)
	Khuman Lampak Main Stadium	35,285	Imphal, Manipur	v Kyrgyzstan (28 March 2023; 2023 Tri-Nation Series (India))
	G. M. C. Balayogi Athletic Stadium	18,000	Hyderabad, Telangana	v Malaysia (18 November 2024; Friendly)
	Jawaharlal Nehru Stadium	20,000	Shillong, Meghalaya	v Bangladesh (25 March 2025; Asian Cup qualifier)

== Kit history ==
The India national team plays in blue, the colour of the Ashoka Chakra on the Indian flag. The other colours on the flag, saffron, white, and India green, were deemed too controversial to be used as the main colour, as jerseys with saffron and green are often used by neighbouring countries.

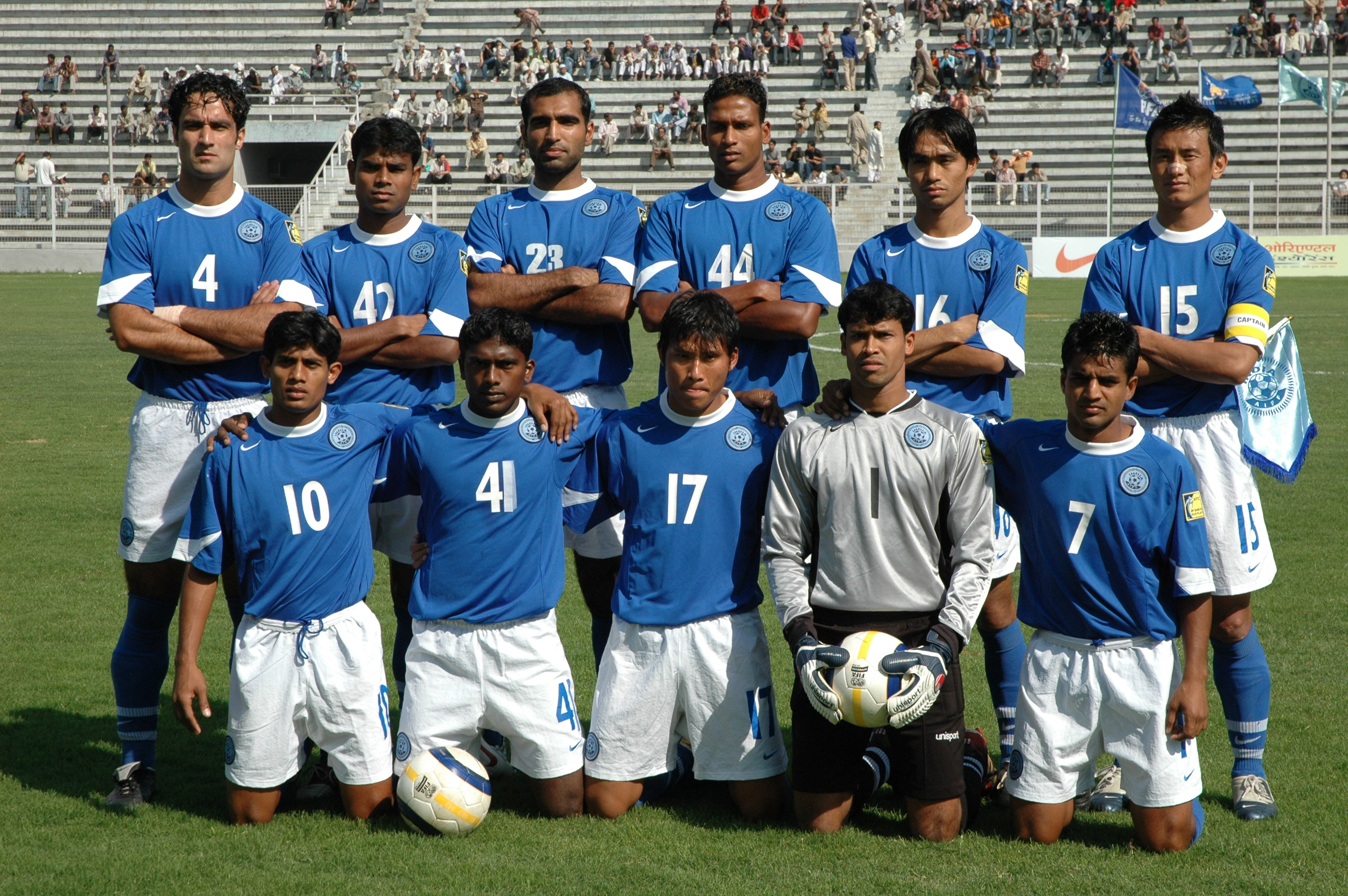
India in 2007, wearing their traditional blue jersey.

After four years with Adidas, the AIFF signed an agreement with American company Nike on 27 February 2006. The deal was for seven years. For the 2011 AFC Asian Cup, in which India were participating, Nike designed India's kit using the same template it used for other national teams such as Brazil. In January 2013. it was announced that the AIFF's deal with Nike was extended for an extra five years. In September 2017, prior to the India U17 side's participation in the FIFA U-17 World Cup, Nike unveiled an all sky blue kit for the India senior and youth teams. Inspired by the history and heritage of the Blue Tigers, India's latest Nike national team kit features a new shade of blue and an orange stripe that runs the length of the jersey and shorts. That stripe expands when a player is in motion to maximize ventilation, complementing Nike's proprietary Dri-FIT technology that helps draw sweat away from the body. These features allow players to perform at their best by remaining cool, dry and more comfortable.

A year later, on 17 December 2018, it was announced that Indian manufacturer Six5Six would replace Nike as India's kit maker. In becoming India's new kit makers, Six5Six also became the first manufacturer to pay for the rights to produce India kits, after both Nike and Adidas didn't pay. Six5Six unveiled their first jersey for the team before the 2019 AFC Asian Cup, with the home colour had a similar sky blue shade and the away colour was changed to white from orange but both the jerseys had unique design embellished on the sleeves representing tiger stripes to pay homage to the Indian football fans, who affectionately calls the team "Blue Tigers", where as the goalkeeper's jersey replaced the light green to orange colour with the same sleeves design. In 2023, Performax, a sportswear brand from Reliance Retail's wide-ranging fashion and lifestyle portfolio, has partnered with the All India Football Federation (AIFF) to become the official kit and merchandise sponsor of the Indian football team.

=== Kit sponsorship ===
Kit supplier	Period
(Germany) Adidas	2002–2006
(United States) Nike	2006–2018
(India) SIX5SIX	2019–2023
(India) Performax	2023–2026
(India) Nivia	2026–

== FIFA World Rankings ==
As of 20 July 2023

Best ranking
Best mover
Worst ranking
Worst mover

India's FIFA world rankings
Rank	Year	Games played	Won	Drawn	Lost	Best		Worst	
Rank	Year	Games played	Won	Drawn	Lost	Rank	Move	Rank	Move
99	2023	11	7	4	0	99	▲1	–	▼ –
106	2022	8	3	1	4	104	▲0	106	▼1
105	2021	12	5	5	2	104	▲0	105	▼1
104	2020	0	0	0	0	104	▲4	109	▼1
108	2019	13	2	7	4	101	▲2	108	▼6
97	2018	12	6	2	4	96	▲3	102	▼1
105	2017	9	7	2	0	96	▲31	132	▼10
135	2016	6	4	0	2	135	▲11	163	▼1
166	2015	12	5	2	5	141	▲26	173	▼15
171	2014	2	0	1	1	145	▲7	171	▼11
154	2013	12	5	2	5	146	▲24	167	▼10
166	2012	11	2	2	7	154	▲4	169	▼7
162	2011	19	7	5	7	144	▲3	163	▼6
142	2010	9	2	0	7	130	▲16	168	▼22
134	2009	6	2	1	3	134	▲11	156	▼9
143	2008	12	8	3	1	143	▲4	154	▼6
143	2007	7	4	1	2	143	▲11	165	▼8
157	2006	6	0	0	6	117	▲9	157	▼13
127	2005	10	5	2	3	127	▲8	135	▼3
132	2004	10	3	2	5	132	▲8	143	▼11
127	2003	8	2	2	4	122	▲5	133	▼3
127	2002	2	1	1	0	120	▲4	130	▼6
121	2001	8	3	2	3	113	▲5	124	▼4
122	2000	4	1	1	2	106	▲0	122	▼5
106	1999	13	8	2	3	106	▲4	116	▼6
110	1998	7	1	1	5	110	▲17	117	▼6
112	1997	8	3	3	2	109	▲10	121	▼3
120	1996	5	1	1	3	94	▲30	124	▼11
121	1995	8	3	3	2	111	▲5	121	▼11
109	1994	4	1	0	3	101	▲9	113	▼8
100	1993	16	11	3	2	99	▲29	129	▼1
143	1992	2	1	0	1	–	▲0	–	▼0

== Notable players ==
"So you are Gostha Pal! The man they call Great Wall of China! Indeed you are Great Wall of China!"

— Nobel laureate Rabindranath Tagore remarked on seeing Pal when he visited Shantiniketan

In the early 20th century when the Indian football was taking shape, India produced one of the best footballers from Asia at that time, Gostha Pal, who started playing professional football at the age of 16 in 1911 and was the first captain of Indian team. He was a skilled, tactful and composed defender of his time and considered as the best defender India had ever produced. He was the first footballer to be awarded Padma Shree in the year 1962 and in 1998 Government of India introduced postal stamp to honour the legend.

In the later 1930s, India came out to be one of the strongest attacking teams from Asia, evidenced during their winter tour of Australia in 1938, where the attacking Indian side including Lumsden, Noor Mohammed, Rahim, K.Prosad, A Nandi under the leadership of K.Bhattacharya stormed the New South Wales coast with a total of 58 goals in 17 matches, which includes five international friendlies against Australia, where Lumsden scored three hat-tricks, one being against the Australian side, thus scoring the first international hat-trick for India.

Talimeren Ao, the first captain of Indian team in independent India was the pioneer of Indian football. His skills in football was glorified as his name which means "a lot of glory" and his legacy is one of the reason for North-east India to be one of the power house of Indian football. At a very young age, dribbling improvised balls made out of rags, cane-strips or pomelos as a real football was hard to come by, gradually improved his skills as defensive midfielder which was frustrating for opponent team strikers. He was asked to join the national colour and was unanimously given the responsibility of leading the team at 1948 Olympics, India's first major tournament since independence and also was the flag bearer of Indian contingents at London. Sarangapani Raman scored the only goal for India at 1948 games which was India's first goal at Olympics. Government of India introduced postal stamp to honour the legend in 2018.

"He was a great defender, with one of the best tackles in business. His man-marking was perfect and it was a tough task for any striker to go past him."

"Manna da never retaliated and remained a perfect gentleman. He was never booked during his very long career!"

— former Indian captains S. S. Narayan & Samar Banerjee remarked on Manna's flawless career.

Walking on Ao's foot steps, it was Sailen Manna who came out as one of the best defender for the team, and was given the team's captaincy in 1951 at Asian Games and led the team to win gold medal, thus started the Indian golden period in football. He later led the team to three Asian Quadrangular Football Tournament from 1952 to 1954 and also captained at the 1952 Olympics and 1954 Asian Games. In 1953, England Football Association rated Manna among 10 Best Skippers of the World in its yearbook., awarded Padma Shri by Government of India in 1971 and AIFF honoured him as "AIFF Player-of-the-Millennium" in 2000.

In the 1950s and 60s, excellent strikers like Sheoo Mewalal, Neville D'Souza, Chuni Goswami, Inder Singh and Tulsidas Balaram played for the national team. Mewalal was known for his fitness and bicycle kicks, who played as striker in the 1948 Olympics, 1952 Olympics and 1951 Asian games where he became highest goal scorer with four goals to help India to win gold. Mewalal became the first Indian to score a hat-trick since independence when he scored it against Burma at the 1952 Asian Quadrangular Football Tournament where as D'Souza is the first Asian player to score a hat-trick in an Olympic Games, scoring a hat-trick against Australia at 1956 Olympics and also was the joint-highest-goal-scorer in that edition of the Games which helped India to reach the semi-final, the best ever India's performance at the Olympics.

"So I see Chuni again. You seem to have become a permanent feature of the final"

— Then President of India Sarvepalli Radhakrishnan remarked on seeing Chuni again in a final match.

Chuni Goswami is multi-sports athlete who played both football and cricket. His balance, dribbling skills, ball control and passing made him a complete striker. He represented the country at 1958 Asian Games and captained at 1962 Asian Games to win gold, 1960 Olympics and also captained at the 1964 Asian Cup where they mined silver. He was one of greatest players in Indian football history and was bestowed with Padma Shri by Government of India and AFC honoured him as Best Striker of Asia in 1962.

Pradip Kumar Banerjee, a refined winger who represented the Indian team at 1956 Olympics and later captained 1960 Olympics, was named as the "Indian Player of the 20th Century " by IFFHS along with Peter Thangaraj as the "Indian Keeper of the 20th Century " who also represented the Indian team in the same edition of Olympics. Banerjee along with Thangaraj also represented India at the 1958, 1962 and 1966 Asian games and at the 1962 edition they won the gold where in the final he scored one of the two winning goals. P.K.Banerjee was honoured with "World Fair Play Award" by CIPF in the year 1989, Padma Shri by Government of India in 1990 and in 2004 FIFA bestowed Banerjee with "FIFA Centennial Order of Merit" Award, the highest honour awarded by FIFA

Since 1970s to 2000 Indian team failed to grow at the same pace as in the 1950s and 1960s. But players like Syed Nayeemuddin had a few stints like winning bronze at 1970 Asian Games. He went on to coach the national team several times between 1986 and 2006. In the 1990s, the best player to emerge was I. M. Vijayan, who was known for his quick movements and skills. He played a long career with 66 international matches for India where he scored 29 goals and captained the India side at several occasions.

In the mid-1990s, Bhaichung Bhutia debuted, who played for the team during a period when its FIFA ranking dipped from 100 during his debut to 160 when he retired. But he successfully led the team to qualify to AFC Asian Cup after a drought of 27 years. He was the captain of the team for over ten years during its low point and under his captaincy, India won the SAFF Championship three times, two Nehru Cup in year 2007 and 2009 and the AFC Challenge Cup in 2008. Considered as one of the greatest footballers of India he is second-most capped player of India with 82 caps and scored 27 times for India. He was awarded the Padma Shri in 2008.

The most famous footballer of the present era is Sunil Chettri, Captain Fantastic as his followers call him. He is the only footballer in India's history who played 100 international matches for India and is the all-time highest goal-scorer of India. He has led the national team to many victories, most importantly qualifying for the AFC Asian Cup and under his leadership the team achieved its highest FIFA ranking of 96 after twenty years. His goal-scoring ability and skills make him the only India striker to score three hat-tricks for India. He also became the second highest goal scorer among active players in international competitions surpassing Lionel Messi in 2019 and was second to Cristiano Ronaldo.

=== List ===
- Gostha Pal
- R. Lumsden
- Noor Mohammed
- K. Prosad
- A. Nandi
- Mohammed Salim
- Talimeran Ao
- Sarangapani Raman
- Sheoo Mewalal
- Sailen Manna
- Neville D'Souza
- Tulsidas Balaram
- P. K. Banerjee
- V. P. Sathyan
- Chuni Goswami
- Jarnail Singh
- Yousuf Khan
- Peter Thangaraj
- Inder Singh
- Syed Nayeemuddin
- Magan Singh Rajvi
- Gurdev Singh Gill
- Prasun Banerjee
- Mohammed Habib
- Shabbir Ali
- Brahmanand Sankhwalkar
- I. M. Vijayan
- Bhaichung Bhutia
- Bruno Coutinho
- Sunil Chhetri
- Steven Dias
- Clifford Miranda
- Gouramangi Singh
- Syed Rahim Nabi
- Subrata Pal
- Jeje Lalpekhlua

== See also ==
- India at the FIFA World Cup qualification
- India national football team at the Olympics
- India at the AFC Asian Cup
- History of Indian football
- Football in India
