= India national football team results (2000–2009) =

Results of India national football team from 2000 to 2009.

Summary Matches 307–381
| Games | Won | Draw | Lost | GF | GA | Win % |
|---|---|---|---|---|---|---|
| 75 | 29 | 16 | 30 | 95 | 110 | 38.67% |
Biggest win
India 6–0 Cambodia 17 August 2007
Biggest defeat
Japan 7–0 India 9 June 2004
Honours
(gold) 2005 SAFF Championship, Pakistan
(gold) 2008 AFC Challenge Cup, India
(silver) 2008 SAFF Championship, Maldives
(bronze) 2003 SAFF Championship, Bangladesh
| ← 1990–99 | | | | 2010–19 → | | |

Key
| Indicates India national football team won the match |
| Indicates the match ended in draw |
| Indicates India national football team lost the match |

== 2000 ==
2 May 2000 (Note: India didn't send a full strength team, but the matches are all considered as full A international by FIFA.)
MFF Golden Jubilee Tournament

| India | 1–1 | Bangladesh |
|---|---|---|
| Abbas Ali Rizni 53' | Report | Mahmud 5' |

National Football Stadium, Malé, Maldives
Attendance: 7,000
Referee: Ali Saleem (Maldives)

5 May 2000
MFF Golden Jubilee Tournament

| India | 0–1 | Sri Lanka |
|---|---|---|
| | Report | Anees 4' |

National Football Stadium, Malé, Maldives
Attendance: 7,000
Referee: Ali Saleem (Maldives)

7 May 2000
MFF Golden Jubilee Tournament

| Maldives | 1–0 | India |
|---|---|---|
| Nizam 69' | Report |

National Football Stadium, Malé, Maldives
Attendance: 10,900
Referee: Subash Lazar (Singapore)

29 July 2000
Friendly

| India | 1–0 | Bangladesh |
|---|---|---|
| Ancheri 10' | Report |

Filbert Street, Leicester, England
Attendance: 2,588
Referee: Dermot Gallagher (England)

== 2001 ==
13 January
17:00 IST
Millennium Super Soccer Cup

| India | 0–3 | Iceland |
|---|---|---|
| | Report | Guðmundsson 44', 52', 69' |

Jawaharlal Nehru Stadium, Kochi
Attendance: 10,000
Referee: G. C. Deshapriya (Sri Lanka)

8 April 2001
16.00 IST
2002 FIFA World Cup Qualifiers

| India | 1–0 | United Arab Emirates |
|---|---|---|
| Jules Alberto 71' | FIFA |

Bangalore Stadium, Bangalore
Attendance: 12,000
Referee: Sun Baojie (China)

16 April 2001
16.00 IST
2002 FIFA World Cup Qualifiers

| India | 1–1 | Yemen |
|---|---|---|
| Bhutia 53' | FIFA | Al Ghurbani 43' |

Bangalore Stadium, Bangalore
Attendance: 21,000
Referee: Chalach Piromya (Thailand)

26 April 2001
21.00 IST
2002 FIFA World Cup Qualifiers

| United Arab Emirates | 1–0 | India |
|---|---|---|
| Khater 63' | FIFA |

Sheikh Khalifa International Stadium, Al Ain City
Attendance: 12,000
Referee: Halim Abdul Hamid (Malaysia)

4 May 2001
18.30 IST
2002 FIFA World Cup Qualifiers

| Yemen | 3–3 | India |
|---|---|---|
| Al-Salimi 13' (pen.), 20', 61' | FIFA | Ancheri 17', 38'; Vijayan 51' |

Althawra Sports City Stadium, Sanaa
Attendance: 25,000
Referee: Suleman Abo Allo (Syria)

11 May 2001
18.45 IST
2002 FIFA World Cup Qualifiers

| Brunei | 0–1 | India |
|---|---|---|
| | Report | Ancheri 75' |

Sultan Hassal Bolkiah Stadium, Bandar Seri Begawan
Attendance: 4,000
Referee: Hassan Al Ajmi (Oman)

20 May 2001
16.00 IST
2002 FIFA World Cup Qualifiers

| India | 5–0 | Brunei |
|---|---|---|
| Jules Alberto 12'; Vijayan 24'; Bhutia 36' (pen.); Ancheri 61'; Abdul Hakim 80' | FIFA |

Bangalore Stadium, Bengaluru
Attendance: 7,000
Referee: Nail Lutfullin (Uzbekistan)

26 Jun 2001
2001 Merdeka Tournament

| Uzbekistan | 2–1 | India |
|---|---|---|
| Hamidullaev 19'; Berdiev 32' | Report | Vijayan 45' |

Stadium Merdeka, Kuala Lumpur, Malaysia

== 2002 ==
29 Aug 2002
18:30 (BST)
Friendly

| Jamaica | 3–0 | India |
|---|---|---|
| Anderson 34'; Lawrence 72'; Goodison 86' | Report |

Vicarage Road, Watford, England
Attendance: 500

1 Sep 2002
16:00 (BST)
Friendly

| Jamaica | 0–0 | India |
|---|---|---|
| | Report |

Molineux, Wolverhampton, England
Attendance: 4,030

== 2003 ==
10 January 2003
2003 SAFF Championship

| India | 0–1 | Pakistan |
|---|---|---|
| | Report | Rasool 50' |

Bangabandhu Stadium, Dhaka
Referee: Tayeb Hasan (Bangladesh)

12 January 2003
2003 SAFF Championship

| India | 4–0 | Afghanistan |
|---|---|---|
| Biswas 30', 63'; D'Cunha 77', 86' | Report |

Bangabandhu Stadium, Dhaka
Referee: Budhi Bahadur Gurung (Nepal)

14 January 2003
2003 SAFF Championship

| India | 1–1 | Sri Lanka |
|---|---|---|
| Biswas 88' | Report | Chryshantha Abeysekera 90' |

Bangabandhu Stadium, Dhaka
Referee: Tayeb Hasan (Bangladesh)

18 January 2003
2003 SAFF Championship, Semi-final

| Bangladesh | 2–1 (a.s.d.e.t.) | India |
|---|---|---|
| Kanchan 77'; Motiur Munna 98' | Report | D'Cunha 81' |

Bangabandhu Stadium, Dhaka
Referee: Kunsuta Chaiwat (Thailand)

18 January 2003
2003 SAFF Championship, Third Place Match

| India | 2–1 (a.s.d.e.t.) | Pakistan |
|---|---|---|
| Vijayan 56'; Jadav 99' | Report | Rasool 66' |

Bangabandhu Stadium, Dhaka
Referee: Tayeb Hasan (Bangladesh)

24 March 2003
2004 Asian Cup Qualifier

| North Korea | 2–0 | India |
|---|---|---|
| Choe So-Hyok 44', 70' | Report |

Kim Il-sung Stadium, Pyongyang, North Korea
Attendance: 40,000

30 March 2003
2004 Asian Cup Qualifier

| India | 1–1 | North Korea |
|---|---|---|
| I.M. Vijayan 29' | Report | Choe Hyun-Yu 85' |

Fatorda Stadium, Margao, India

16 October 2003
Friendly

| Thailand | 2–0 | India |
|---|---|---|
| Phoruendee 64'; Chaikamdee 78' | Report |

Thai-Japanese Stadium, Bangkok, Thailand

== 2004 ==
18 February 2004
16.00 IST
2006 FIFA World Cup Qualifier

| India | 1–0 | Singapore |
|---|---|---|
| Renedy 50' | FIFA |

Fatorda Stadium, Margao
Attendance: 28,000
Referee: Farajollah Yasrebi (Iran)

31 March 2004
17.45 IST
2006 FIFA World Cup Qualifier

| India | 1–5 | Oman |
|---|---|---|
| Renedy 18' | Report | Ali 12'; Mubarak 26', 49'; Al-Hinai 60', 88' |

Jawaharlal Nehru Stadium, Kochi
Attendance: 48,000
Referee: Danny Kim Heng (Malaysia)

3 June 2004
Friendly

| Indonesia | 1–1 | India |
|---|---|---|
| Astaman 33' | Report | Ancheri 89' (pen.) |

Gelora Bung Karno Stadium, Jakarta, Indonesia

9 June 2004
15.50 IST
2006 FIFA World Cup Qualifier

| Japan | 7–0 | India |
|---|---|---|
| Kubo 12'; Fukunishi 25'; Nakamura 29'; Suzuki 54'; Nakazawa 65', 76'; Ogasawara 68' | Report |

Saitama Stadium, Saitama
Attendance: 63,000
Referee: Huang Junjie (China PR)

22 August 2004
LG Cup

| India | 2–1 | Myanmar |
|---|---|---|
| R.C. Prakash 42', 83' | Report | Aung Win Naing 81' |

Thống Nhất Stadium, Ho Chi Minh City, Vietnam

24 August 2004
LG Cup

| Vietnam | 2–1 | India |
|---|---|---|
| Lê Công Vinh 21'; Thạch Bảo Khanh 57' | Report | Climax Lawrence 87' |

Thống Nhất Stadium, Ho Chi Minh City, Vietnam

8 September 2004
17.30 IST
2006 FIFA World Cup Qualifier

| India | 0–4 | Japan |
|---|---|---|
| | Report | Suzuki 45'; Ono 60'; Fukunishi 71'; Miyamoto 87' |

Salt Lake Stadium, Kolkata
Attendance: 90,000
Referee: Basel Hajjar (Syria)

13 October 2004
18.00 IST
2006 FIFA World Cup Qualifier

| Singapore | 2–0 | India |
|---|---|---|
| Sahdan 73'; Amri 76' | Report |

Jalan Besar Stadium, Singapore
Attendance: 3,609
Referee: Yousuf Husain (Bahrain)

5 November 2004
Friendly

| Kuwait | 2–3 | India |
|---|---|---|
| Al Hamad 35'; Abdullah 54' | Report | Singh 48'; Zirsanga 64'; Yadav 75' |

Kuwait City, Kuwait

17 November 2004
19:30 IST
2006 FIFA World Cup Qualifier

| Oman | 0–0 | India |
|---|---|---|
| | Report |

Sultan Qaboos Sports Complex, Muscat
Attendance: 2,000
Referee: Mahmoud Nurilddin (Iraq)

== 2005 ==
12 June 2005
17:00 PST
Friendly

| Pakistan | 1–1 | India |
|---|---|---|
| Essa 78' | Report | Chhetri 65' |

Ayub National Stadium, Quetta, Pakistan
Attendance: 20,000
Referee: Jehangir Khan (Pakistan)

16 June 2005
20:30 PST
Friendly

| Pakistan | 0–1 | India |
|---|---|---|
| | Report | Abdul Hakkim 67' |

Qayyum Stadium, Peshawar, Pakistan
Referee: Imtiaz Ali (Pakistan)

18 June 2005
20:30 PST
Friendly

| Pakistan | 3–0 | India |
|---|---|---|
| Essa 2'; Tanveer 45+1'; Mehmood 46' | Report |

Punjab Stadium, Lahore, Pakistan
Attendance: 11,000
Referee: Jehangir Khan (Pakistan)

12 August 2005
Friendly

| Fiji | 1–0 | India |
|---|---|---|
| Masi 14' (pen.) | Report |

Churchill Park, Lautoka, Fiji
Attendance: 10,000
Referee: Neil Fox (New Zealand)

14 August 2005
Friendly

| Fiji | 2–1 | India |
|---|---|---|
| Luke Vidovi 25'; Masi 61' | Report | I. Singh 10' |

Churchill Park, Lautoka, Fiji
Attendance: 11,000
Referee: Peter O'Leary (New Zealand)

8 December 2005
2005 SAFF Championship

| India | 2–1 | Nepal |
|---|---|---|
| Mehtab Hossain 6', 28' | Report | Basanta Thapa 35' |

Peoples Football Stadium, Karachi

10 December 2005
2005 SAFF Championship

| India | 3–0 | Bhutan |
|---|---|---|
| Baichung Bhutia 45'; Mahesh Gawli 51'; Abdul Hakim 64' | Report |

Peoples Football Stadium, Karachi

12 December 2005
2005 SAFF Championship

| Bangladesh | 1–1 | India |
|---|---|---|
| Ameli 77' | Report | Lawrence 17' |

Peoples Football Stadium, Karachi
Referee: Hettikamkanamge Perera (Sri Lanka)

14 December 2005
2005 SAFF Championship

| Maldives | 0–1 | India |
|---|---|---|
| | Report | Manju 38' |

Peoples Football Stadium, Karachi

17 December 2005
2005 SAFF Championship

| India | 2–0 | Bangladesh |
|---|---|---|
| Wadoo 33'; Bhutia 81' | Report |

Peoples Football Stadium, Karachi
Referee: Ashfarian Khodadad (Iran)

== 2006 ==
22 April 2006
Friendly

| Hong Kong | 2–2 | India |
|---|---|---|
| Ambassa 3'; Bong 17' | Report | Nabi 61'; Bhutia 67' (pen.) |

Hong Kong Stadium, Causeway Bay, Hong Kong Island

22 February 2006
19:20 JST
2007 Asian Cup Qualifier

| Japan | 6–0 | India |
|---|---|---|
| Ono 32'; Maki 58'; Fukunishi 68'; Kubo 78', 90'; Satō 82' | Report |

Yokohama International Stadium, Yokohama, Japan
Attendance: 38,025
Referee: Huang Junjie (China)

1 March 2006
14:30 IST
2007 Asian Cup Qualifier

| India | 0–3 | Yemen |
|---|---|---|
| | Report | Salem Abdullah 6'; Al-Hubaishi 43'; Al Nono 56' (pen.) |

Ambedkar Stadium, New Delhi, India
Attendance: 8,000
Referee: Mohsen Torky (Iran)

16 August 2006
15:00 IST
2007 Asian Cup Qualifier

| India | 0–3 | Saudi Arabia |
|---|---|---|
| | Report | Al-Qahtani 2', 19', 50' |

Salt Lake Stadium, Kolkata
Attendance: 10,000
Referee: Satop Tongkhan (Thailand)

6 September 2006
20:30 SAST
2007 Asian Cup Qualifier

| Saudi Arabia | 7–1 | India |
|---|---|---|
| Bashir 30', 46'; Al Mahyani 33'; Ameen 57'; Hagbani 61'; Swaileh 78', 86' | Report | Manju 22' |

Prince Abdullah Al-Faisal Stadium, Jeddah, Saudi Arabia
Attendance: 3,000
Referee: Mohamed Omar Al Saeedi (United Arab Emirates)

11 October 2006
17:40 IST
2007 Asian Cup Qualifier

| India | 0–3 | Japan |
|---|---|---|
| | Report | Bando 23', 44'; Nakamura 83' |

Sree Kanteerava Stadium, Bangalore, India
Attendance: 5,000
Referee: Chan Siu Kee (Hong Kong)

15 November 2006
16:00 AST
2007 Asian Cup Qualifier

| Yemen | 2–1 | India |
|---|---|---|
| Nashwan Al-Haggam 60'; Al-Nono 82' | Report | Pradeep 52' |

Ali Mohsen Stadium, Sana'a
Attendance: 5,500
Referee: Hassan Marshoud (Jordan)

== 2007 ==
17 August 2007
18:30 IST
2007 Nehru Cup

| India | 6–0 | Cambodia |
|---|---|---|
| Pradeep 16'; Bhutia 45+2' (pen.); Dias 72', 89'; Chhetri 82', 84' | Report |

Ambedkar Stadium, New Delhi
Referee: Pepera Hetti Kamkanamge (Sri Lanka)

20 August 2007
19:00 IST
2007 Nehru Cup

| India | 1–0 | Bangladesh |
|---|---|---|
| Bhutia 5' | Report |

Ambedkar Stadium, New Delhi
Referee: Sikhrakar Surendra (Nepal)

23 August 2007
19:00 IST
2007 Nehru Cup

| India | 2–3 | Syria |
|---|---|---|
| Chhetri 13'; Ajayan 81' | Report | Al Baba 23'; Chaabo 45+1', 65' |

Ambedkar Stadium, New Delhi
Referee: Sikhrakar Surendra (Nepal)

26 August 2007
19:00 IST
2007 Nehru Cup

| India | 3–0 | Kyrgyzstan |
|---|---|---|
| Bhutia 39'; Chhetri 60'; Yadav 90+3' | Report |

Ambedkar Stadium, New Delhi
Referee: Sikhrakar Surendra (Nepal)

29 August 2007
18:00 IST
2007 Nehru Cup

| India | 1–0 | Syria |
|---|---|---|
| Pradeep 44' | Report |

Ambedkar Stadium, New Delhi
Referee: Sikhrakar Surendra (Nepal)

8 October 2007
21:00 UTC+3
2010 FIFA World Cup Qualifier

| Lebanon | 4–1 | India |
|---|---|---|
| Antar 33'; Ghaddar 62', 76'; El Ali 63' | Report | Chhetri 30' |

Saida International Stadium, Saida
Attendance: 500
Referee: Saad Al Fahdli (Kuwait)

30 October 2007
15:00 UTC+5:30
2010 FIFA World Cup Qualifier

| India | 2–2 | Lebanon |
|---|---|---|
| Chhetri 29'; Dias 90+2' | FIFA | Ghaddar 74' (pen.), 85' |

Fatorda Stadium, Goa, Goa, India
Attendance: 10,000
Referee: Saad Al Fahdli (Kuwait)

== 2008 ==
24 May 2008
Friendly

| India | 3–0 | Chinese Taipei |
|---|---|---|
| Pradeep 61'; Chhetri 77', 89' | Report |

Fatorda Stadium, Goa, India

27 May 2008
Friendly

| India | 2–2 | Chinese Taipei |
|---|---|---|
| Pradeep 40', 70' | Report | Chen Po-liang 4'; Meng-Hsuan Hsieh 45+3' |

Jawaharlal Nehru Stadium, Chennai, India

3 June 2008
16:00 MVT
2008 SAFF Championship

| India | 4–0 | Nepal |
|---|---|---|
| Pradeep 26'; Bhutia 34'; Chhetri 67'; S. K. Singh 83' | Report |

Rasmee Dhandu Stadium, Malé

5 June 2008
16:00 MVT
2008 SAFF Championship

| India | 2–1 | Pakistan |
|---|---|---|
| Pradeep 25'; Dias 45+1' | Report | Adnan Ahmed 88' |

Rasmee Dhandu Stadium, Malé

7 June 2008
21:00 MVT
2008 SAFF Championship

| Maldives | 0–1 | India |
|---|---|---|
| | Report | Gouramangi 14' |

Rasmee Dhandu Stadium, Malé

11 June 2008
16:00 MVT
2008 SAFF Championship, Semi-final

| India | 2–1 (a.e.t) | Bhutan |
|---|---|---|
| Chhetri 30'; Gouramangi 120+1' | Report | Dorji 18' |

Rasmee Dhandu Stadium, Malé
Attendance: 12,000

13 June 2008
19:00 SLST
2008 SAFF Championship, Final

| India | 0–1 | Maldives |
|---|---|---|
| | Report | Naseer 87' |

Sugathadasa Stadium, Colombo, Sri Lanka
Attendance: 20,000

22 July 2008
Friendly

| India | 1–1 | Malaysia |
|---|---|---|
| Bhutia 57' | Report | Putra 80' (pen.) |

Lal Bahadur Shastri Stadium, Hyderabad, India
Referee: S. Suresh (India)

30 July 2008
18:30 IST
2008 AFC Challenge Cup

| India | 1–0 | Afghanistan |
|---|---|---|
| Lawrence 90+2' | Report |

Gachibowli Athletic Stadium, Hyderabad
Attendance: 300
Referee: Masaaki Toma (Japan)

1 August 2008
16:00 IST
2008 AFC Challenge Cup

| Tajikistan | 1–1 | India |
|---|---|---|
| Rabiev 11' | Report | Tuychiev 61' (o.g.) |

Gachibowli Athletic Stadium, Hyderabad
Attendance: 350
Referee: Tayeb Shamsuzzaman (Bangladesh)

3 August 2008
18:30 IST
2008 AFC Challenge Cup

| Turkmenistan | 1–2 | India |
|---|---|---|
| Orazmämmedow 84' | Report | Bhutia 54', 80' |

Gachibowli Athletic Stadium, Hyderabad
Attendance: 1,000
Referee: Khalid Al-Senan (United Arab Emirates)

7 August 2008
16:00 IST
2008 AFC Challenge Cup, Semi-final

| India | 1–0 | Myanmar |
|---|---|---|
| Chhetri 82' | Report |

Gachibowli Athletic Stadium, Hyderabad
Attendance: 1,500
Referee: Tayeb Shamsuzzaman (Bangladesh)

13 August 2008
19:00 IST
2008 AFC Challenge Cup, Final

| India | 4–1 | Tajikistan |
|---|---|---|
| Chhetri 9', 23', 75'; Bhutia 18' | AIFF | Fatkhuloev 44' |

Ambedkar Stadium, New Delhi
Attendance: 10,000
Referee: Valentin Kovalenko (Uzbekistan)

== 2009 ==
14 Jan 2009
Friendly

| Hong Kong | 2–1 | India |
|---|---|---|
| Yiu Chung 70'; Wai Chu 90' | Report | Bhutia 80' |

Hong Kong Stadium, Hong Kong

19 Aug 2009
2009 Nehru Cup

| India | 0–1 | Lebanon |
|---|---|---|
| | Report | Al Saadi 4' |

Ambedkar Stadium, Delhi, India

23 Aug 2009
2009 Nehru Cup

| India | 2–1 | Kyrgyzstan |
|---|---|---|
| Bhutia 43'; Chhetri 58' (pen.) | Report | Murzaev 89' |

Ambedkar Stadium, Delhi, India

26 Aug 2009
2009 Nehru Cup

| India | 3–1 | Sri Lanka |
|---|---|---|
| Bhutia 25'; Gouramangi 69'; Dias 85' | Report | Dinesh Ruwanthilake 62' |

Ambedkar Stadium, Delhi, India

29 Aug 2009
2009 Nehru Cup

| India | 0–1 | Syria |
|---|---|---|
| | Report | Diab 18' |

Ambedkar Stadium, Delhi, India

29 Aug 2009
2009 Nehru Cup

| Syria | 1–1 | India |
|---|---|---|
| Diab 120' (a.e.t.) | Report | Renedy 114' (a.e.t.) |
Penalties
| Rafe (penalty scored); Ayan (penalty missed); Haj Mohamad (penalty missed); Balhous (penalty scored); Al Agha (penalty scored); Al Hussain (penalty scored); Al Aitoni (penalty missed) | 4–5 | (penalty scored) Lawrence; (penalty missed) Renedy; (penalty scored) Chhetri; (penalty scored) Dias; (penalty missed) Wadoo; (penalty scored) A. Ali; (penalty scored) Surkumar |

Ambedkar Stadium, Delhi, India
Attendance: 35,000
Referee: Ali Adil (Maldives)

== Opponents ==
| Team | Pld | W | D | L | GF | GA | GD |
|---|---|---|---|---|---|---|---|
| Afghanistan | 2 | 2 | 0 | 0 | 5 | 0 | +5 |
| Bangladesh | 6 | 3 | 2 | 1 | 7 | 4 | +3 |
| Bhutan | 2 | 2 | 0 | 0 | 5 | 1 | +4 |
| Brunei | 2 | 2 | 0 | 0 | 6 | 0 | +6 |
| Cambodia | 1 | 1 | 0 | 0 | 6 | 0 | +6 |
| Chinese Taipei | 2 | 1 | 1 | 0 | 5 | 2 | +3 |
| Fiji | 2 | 0 | 0 | 2 | 1 | 3 | –2 |
| Hong Kong | 2 | 0 | 1 | 1 | 3 | 4 | –1 |
| Iceland | 1 | 0 | 0 | 1 | 0 | 3 | –3 |
| Indonesia | 1 | 0 | 1 | 0 | 1 | 1 | 0 |
| Jamaica | 2 | 0 | 1 | 1 | 0 | 3 | –3 |
| Japan | 4 | 0 | 0 | 4 | 0 | 20 | –20 |
| Kuwait | 1 | 1 | 0 | 0 | 3 | 2 | +1 |
| Kyrgyzstan | 2 | 2 | 0 | 0 | 5 | 1 | +4 |
| Lebanon | 3 | 0 | 1 | 2 | 3 | 7 | –4 |
| Malaysia | 1 | 0 | 1 | 0 | 1 | 1 | 0 |
| Maldives | 4 | 2 | 0 | 2 | 2 | 2 | 0 |
| Myanmar | 2 | 2 | 0 | 0 | 3 | 1 | +2 |
| Nepal | 2 | 2 | 0 | 0 | 6 | 1 | +5 |
| North Korea | 2 | 0 | 1 | 1 | 1 | 3 | –2 |
| Oman | 2 | 0 | 1 | 1 | 1 | 5 | –4 |
| Pakistan | 6 | 3 | 1 | 2 | 6 | 7 | –1 |
| Saudi Arabia | 2 | 0 | 0 | 2 | 1 | 10 | –9 |
| Singapore | 2 | 1 | 0 | 1 | 1 | 2 | –1 |
| Sri Lanka | 3 | 1 | 1 | 1 | 4 | 3 | +1 |
| Syria | 4 | 1 | 1 | 2 | 4 | 5 | –1 |
| Tajikistan | 2 | 1 | 1 | 0 | 5 | 2 | +3 |
| Thailand | 1 | 0 | 0 | 1 | 0 | 2 | –2 |
| Turkmenistan | 1 | 1 | 0 | 0 | 2 | 1 | +1 |
| United Arab Emirates | 2 | 1 | 0 | 1 | 1 | 1 | 0 |
| Uzbekistan | 1 | 0 | 0 | 1 | 1 | 2 | –1 |
| Vietnam | 1 | 0 | 0 | 1 | 1 | 2 | –1 |
| Yemen | 4 | 0 | 2 | 2 | 5 | 9 | –4 |
| Total | 75 | 29 | 16 | 30 | 95 | 110 | –15 |

== See also ==
- Unofficial games of India in 2000s
- Indian women's national football team results (2000–2009)
- India national football team results (1990–1999)
- India national football team results (2010–2019)
