= 1997 Nehru Cup =

Tournament details
- Host country: India
- Dates: 30 March – 12 April
- Teams: 5 (from 2 confederations)
- Venue: 1 (in 1 host city)

Final positions
- Champions: Iraq (2nd title)
- Runners-up: Uzbekistan U-19

Tournament statistics
- Matches played: 13
- Goals scored: 36 (2.77 per match)
- Top scorer: (Iraq) Sadiq Saadoun (4 goals)

The 1997 Nehru Cup was held in Kochi, India. The Nehru Cup is an international association football tournament, organised by the All India Football Federation, which was launched in 1982. Participating nations in 1997 were Iraq, China, India, Ghana and Uzbekistan. The winner of the Nehru Cup was Iraq, whilst India did not record a single win, in drawing three matches and losing one. In the semi-final match, more than 60,000 tickets were sold.

== Matches ==
Team	Pld	W	D	L	GF	GA	GD	Pts
Iraq	4	4	0	0	10	1	+9	12
Uzbekistan U-19	4	1	2	1	7	11	−4	5
India (H)	4	0	3	1	4	5	−1	3
China B	4	0	3	1	1	3	−2	3
Ghana XI	4	0	2	2	4	6	−2	2

(H) Host
30 March 1997

Iraq	2–0	China B
Mahmoud 30'; Kadhim 73'	Report

Attendance: 10,000

1 April 1997

India	0–0	China B
	Report

2 April 1997

Iraq	6–1	Uzbekistan U-19
Mahmoud 13'; Saadoun 36', 49'; Hussein 49'; Najim 83'; Jeayer 89'	Report	Mataliev 70'

3 April 1997

Ghana XI	0–0	China B
	Report

Attendance: 20,000

4 April 1997

India	2–2	Uzbekistan U-19
Vijayan 41'; Chapman 86'	Report	Soliev 24'; Akopyants 81'

Attendance: 20,000

5 April 1997

Iraq	1–0	Ghana XI
Saadoun 70'	Report

Attendance: 7,000
5 April 1997

China B	1–1	Uzbekistan U-19
Sun Zhi 33'	Report	M. Aleksei 47'

Attendance: 15,000

6 April 1997

India	0–1	Iraq
	Report	Chathir 24'

Attendance: 25,000

7 April 1997

Uzbekistan U-19	3–2	Ghana XI
Ponomarev 43'; Mataliev 75'; Akopyants 85'	Report	Yam 33', 57'

Attendance: 20,000

8 April 1997

India	2–2	Ghana XI
Vijayan 10'; Bhutia 53'	Report	Donkor 37'; Owusu-Ansah 80'

Attendance: 35,000

=== Knock-out stage ===
Semi-finals
9 April
Uzbekistan U-19	2
China B	1
10 April
Iraq (pen)	1 (4)
India	1 (2)

Final
11 April
Iraq	3
Uzbekistan U-19	1
Third place
12 April
China B	2
India	1

=== Semi-finals ===
9 April 1997

Uzbekistan U-19	2–1	China B
Hashimov (?); Akopyants (?)	Report	Qui Zhong Hui (?)

Attendance: 15,000

10 April 1997

Iraq	1–1 (a.e.t.)	India
Saadoun (?)	Report	Chapman (?)
Penalties
	4–2

Attendance: 1,00,000

=== Third place match ===
11 April 1997

China B	2–1	India
Bao Wen Jie (?); Yong (?)	Report	Bhutia (?)

Attendance: 18,500

=== Final ===
12 April 1997

Iraq	3–1	Uzbekistan U-19
Fawzi 5'; Kuralev (?); Hussein 60'	Report	Mataliev (?)

Attendance: 15,000

== Winners ==
1997 Nehru Cup champion

Iraq
Second title

== Statistics ==
=== Goalscorers ===
There were 36 goals scored in 13 matches, for an average of 2.77 goals per match.

4 goals

- (Iraq) Sadiq Saadoun

3 goals

- (Uzbekistan) U-19 Mataliev
- (Uzbekistan) U-19 Andrey Akopyants

2 goals

- (Ghana) XI Sekyi Yam
- (India) Inivalappil Mani Vijayan
- (India) Carlton Chapman
- (India) Baichung Bhutia
- (Iraq) Haidar Mahmoud
- (Iraq) Laith Hussein

1 goal

- (China) U-19 Qui Zhong Hui
- (China) U-19 Bao Wen Jie
- (China) U-19 Huang Yong
- (China) U-19 Sun Zhi
- (Ghana) XI Alex Donkor
- (Ghana) XI Princeton Owusu-Ansah
- (Iraq) Alaa Kadhim
- (Iraq) Haidar Najim
- (Iraq) Sabah Jeayer
- (Iraq) Qahtan Chathir
- (Iraq) Hussam Fawzi
- (Uzbekistan) U-19 Anvarjon Soliev
- (Uzbekistan) U-19 Vyacheslav Ponomarev
- (Uzbekistan) U-19 Hikmat Hashimov
- (Uzbekistan) U-19 M. Aleksei

1 own goal

- (Uzbekistan) U-19 Kuralev (against Iraq)
