= List of India international footballers =

This is a list of Indian international footballers, who have played for the India national football team since its foundation in 1938, before the country's independence. Players with 22 or more official caps are listed here.

- **Bold** denotes players still playing international football.

All statistics are correct up to and including the match played on 25 September 2026.

#	Name	Career	Caps	Goals
1	Sunil Chhetri	2005–24	157	95
2	**Gurpreet Singh Sandhu**	2011–	89	0
3	Bhaichung Bhutia	1995–2011	84	27
4	**Sandesh Jhingan**	2015–	76	6
5	Shabbir Ali	1974–84	72	23
5	Climax Lawrence	2003–11	72	3
5	I. M. Vijayan	1989–2004	72	29
8	Gouramangi Singh	2006–13	71	6
9	Subrata Paul	2007–2017	67	92 (conceded)
10	Mahesh Gawli	2000–11	66	1
11	Syed Rahim Nabi	2004–13	61	7
12	**Anirudh Thapa**	2017–	60	4
13	Renedy Singh	1999–2011	59	4
14	Jeje Lalpekhlua	2011–2019	56	23
15	Udanta Singh Kumam	2016–	55	3
15	**Lallianzuala Chhangte**	2015–	55	9
17	Surkumar Singh Irungbam	2001–11	52	2
17	**Pritam Kotal**	2015–	52	0
19	Steven Dias	2004–11	51	7
20	**Rahul Bheke**	2019–	50	3
20	**Manvir Singh**	2017–	50	7
22	Deepak Mondal	1999–2011	47	0
23	Clifford Miranda	2005–14	45	6
23	**Subhasish Bose**	2017–	45	0
25	**Ashique Kuruniyan**	2018–	43	2
25	**Sahal Abdul Samad**	2019–	42	3
27	N. P. Pradeep	2005–11	42	9
28	V. P. Sathyan	1985–1995	40+	4
29	**Suresh Singh Wangjam**	2021–	40	1
30	Samir Subash Naik	2002–12	38	0
31	Pradip Kumar Banerjee	1952–67	36	19
31	**Anwar Ali**	2022–	36	2
33	Abhishek Yadav	2002–11	35	4
33	Rowllin Borges	2015–2023	35	2
33	**Akash Mishra**	2021–	35	1
36	**Liston Colaço**	2021-	34	1
37	Jo Paul Ancheri	1992–2005	33	7
37	Anwar Ali Sr.	2008–2019	33	0
37	**Brandon Fernandes**	2019–	33	1
37	**Nikhil Poojary**	2017–	33	1
41	Mehrajuddin Wadoo	2005–11	32	2
41	**Jeakson Singh Thounaojam**	2021–	32	1
43	Mehtab Hossain	2005–15	31	2
43	Francis Fernandes	2005-2015	31	1
45	Robin Singh	2012–2019	30	5
45	**Mahesh Singh Naorem**	2023–	30	1
47	Anthony Pereira	2009–2013	29	3
47	Narayan Das	2011–2019	29	1
47	**Lalengmawia Ralte**	2021–	29	0
50	Jewel Raja	2010–2013	28	3
51	Sushil Kumar Singh	2008–2012	27	2
51	Arnab Mondal	2013–2016	27	1
51	Halicharan Narzary	2015–2021	27	1
54	Raju Gaikwad	2011–2022	25	0
55	Eugeneson Lyngdoh	2015–2021	24	0
55	**Farukh Choudhary**	2018–	24	3
57	Pronay Halder	2017–2022	23	1
58	Lenny Rodrigues	2012–2015	22	0

Note. There might be more footballers who have played 22 or more official international matches for India.
