= Muhammad Nauman Khan =

Pakistani footballer (born 1968)

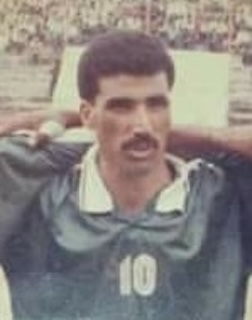
- Nauman with Pakistan at the 1997 SAFF Gold Cup

Personal information
- Full name: Muhammad Nauman Khan
- Date of birth: 4 February 1968 (age 58)
- Place of birth: Malakand Agency, Pakistan
- Height: 1.72 m (5 ft 8 in)
- Position: Striker

Youth career
- 1984–??: Shaheen FC

Senior career*
Years	Team	Apps	(Gls)
1989–1999	Pakistan Army		
1992	→ Wohaib (loan)		
1993	→ Defence FC (loan)		

International career
1991–1997	Pakistan	18	(6)

Managerial career
- 2010: Pakistan Army
Medal record
Men's football
Representing Pakistan
South Asian Games
Gold medal – first place	1991 Colombo	Team competition
- * Club domestic league appearances and goals

Muhammad Nauman Khan (Urdu, Pashto: محمد نعمان خان; born 4 February 1968) is a Pakistani former footballer who played as a striker. A former captain of the national team, Nauman was the author of the last goal in the final against Maldives, which saw Pakistan retain their second title in the 1991 South Asian Games. He also captained Pakistan Army F.C., winning the National Football Championship title in 1993 and 1995. He also served as a Lieutenant Colonel in the Pakistan Army.

== Early life ==
Nauman was born on 4 February 1968, in Malakand Agency in Pakistan. He hailed from the Dheri Alladand village. He started playing at a young age in school, and later in a local club called Shaheen Football Club around 1984. After finishing matric, he joined Islamia College University in Peshawar where he played for the college football club.

== Club career ==
After 6 months at the Islamia College University, Nauman joined the Pakistan Army, and was picked by the Pakistan Army football team in 1989.

Nauman was team captain when Pakistan Army clinched the National Football Championship title in 1993–94 and 1995. He was also borrowed by Wohaib FC to take part in the qualifying round of the 1992–93 Asian Club Championship, where the team earned victories over Club Valencia from Maldives and Brothers Union from Bangladesh to qualify for Group B, becoming the first Pakistani club to pass the qualifying round of an Asian competition. However, after the qualification, Nauman returned to Army after the start of the 1992–93, held from 20 October 1992 to 14 February 1993. Nauman also represented Defence Club at the 1993–94 Asian Club Championship qualifying round against Oman Club.

== International career ==
He made his international debut in the 1991 South Asian Games in Colombo under the captainship of Ghulam Sarwar Teddy. Nauman scored in the final against Maldives. In the dying minutes of the game, Nauman scored the last goal in the 87th minute after Qazi Ashfaq, finishing the match by a 2–0 victory for Pakistan, and winning their second title in the competition.

In the 1993 SAARC Gold Cup, Nauman scored against India in their first match between the two in 1993, ending in a 1–1 draw, with strikes from Nauman and IM Vijayan. After scoring against Sri Lanka in a 1–2 defeat, he again scored a brace against India in the 1993 South Asian Games, in the eventual 2–2 draw.

He captained the national team in the subsequent 1995 SAARC Gold Cup. In the 1997 SAFF Gold Cup, he scored against Nepal in a 2–0 victory in the first match of the tournament, as Pakistan finished at the third place.

== Post-retirement ==
Nauman served as Lt. Colonel in the Pakistan Army after retirement from the game. In October 2008, the Pakistan Football Federation approved 30 participants for the International Olympic Committee's Olympic Solidarity Technical Course, including Nauman.

In 2010, Nauman acted as head coach of Pakistan Army.

Nauman participated in the 2015, and 2018 elections of the Pakistan Football Federation.

In 2024, Nauman participated in the 2024 elections of the Pakistan Football Federation, getting initially elected as president of the Malakand district in early 2024. He was controversially accused of forgery by Batkhela XI football club in Malakand. Jameel Islam, the injured party and president of the club, contended that Nauman made himself the president of his club in order to contest the district elections from Malakand. Jameel also accused Nauman of making fake clubs during club scrutiny. Nauman was initially reported as the favourite candidate of the normalisation committee installed by FIFA to contest for the PFF presidency. However, on 28 August 2024, Nauman along with 21 former officials faced a lifetime ban due to their alleged role in creating a parallel association and orchestrating a hostile takeover of the PFF offices three years ago, on 27 March 2021. The following month, Nauman was cleared after an appeal to the Pakistan Football Federation and was able to contest for the consequent provincial stage of the elections, where he eventually lost.

== Career statistics ==
=== International goals ===
Scores and results list Pakistan's goal tally first, score column indicates score after each Nauman goal.

List of international goals scored by Muhammad Nauman Khan
No.	Date	Venue	Opponent	Score	Result	Competition	Ref.
1	29 December 1991	Sugathadasa Stadium, Sri Lanka	Maldives	2–0	2–0	1991 South Asian Games	
2	23 July 1993	Railway Stadium, Pakistan	India	1–1	1–1	1993 SAARC Gold Cup	
3	20 December 1993	Mirpur Stadium, Bangladesh	Sri Lanka	1–0	1–2	1993 South Asian Games	
4	24 December 1993	Dhaka Stadium, Bangladesh	India	1–1	2–2	1993 South Asian Games	
5	24 December 1993	Dhaka Stadium, Bangladesh	India		2–2	1993 South Asian Games	
6	4 September 1997	Dasharath Rangasala, Nepal	Nepal	1–0	2–0	1997 SAFF Gold Cup	

== Honours ==
=== Pakistan Army ===
- National Football Championship
  - Winners (2): 1993–94, 1995

=== Pakistan ===
- South Asian Games:
  - Winners (1): 1991

== See also ==
- List of Pakistan national football team captains
