= India women's national football team results (1990–1999) =

This article shows the results of India women's national football team from 1990 to 1999.

== Legend ==
Win Draw Loss

Until the 1990s, the Indian women's national team was controlled by the Women Football Federation of India (WFFI), which was affiliated to Asian Ladies' Football Confederation (ALFC), neither of which were affiliated to AFC or FIFA. Due to this, FIFA refused to recognize the international matches played by the team from 1975 to 1994.

== 1994 ==
28 August Jayalalitha Cup	India	0–2	Uzbekistan	Madras, India
				Stadium: Jawaharlal Nehru Stadium

2 September Jayalalitha Cup	India	1–8	Hungary	Madras, India
	Pushpa Das 1'		Edit Kern 16'; Medio Pnbeli Judit; Ildiko; Oroszki Ildikó; Beata; Aranka Paraoánu 72'	Stadium: Jawaharlal Nehru Stadium

4 September Jayalalitha Cup	India	1–2	Chile	Madras, India
	Chaoba Devi 55' (pen.)		Jessica Sanchez 30'; Ada Cruz 45'	Stadium: Jawaharlal Nehru Stadium

Senior A international matches onwards

== 1995 ==
23 September AFC Women C	Uzbekistan	1–0	India	Kota Kinabalu, Malaysia
		RSSSF		Stadium: Likas Stadium

25 September AFC Women C	Japan	6–0	India	Kota Kinabalu, Malaysia
	Yumi Obe; Nami Otake; Emiko Takeoka; Kaori Nagamine	RSSSF		Stadium: Likas Stadium

27 September AFC Women C	South Korea	5–0	India	Kota Kinabalu, Malaysia
		RSSSF		Stadium: Likas Stadium

== 1997 ==
5 December AFC Women C	India	3–0	Hong Kong	Guangdong, China
	Tababi Devi 23'; Lokeshwari Devi 58', 80'	RSSSF

7 December AFC Women C	Japan	1–0	India	Guangdong, China
	Homare Sawa	RSSSF

9 December AFC Women C	India	10–0	Guam	Guangdong, China
	Chaoba Devi; Lokeshwari Devi; Tababi Devi	RSSSF

== 1998 ==
7 December Asian Games	India	0–7	South Korea	Pathum Thani, Thailand
14:00 UTC+07:00			Seong Mi Son; Sung Mi Cha; Maria Rebello (o.g.); Mi Yeon	Stadium: Thammasat Stadium

9 December Asian Games	India	1–13	Chinese Taipei	Pathum Thani, Thailand
16:00 UTC+07:00	Tababi Devi		Ming-shu Lee; Ii-Min Hung; Huey-Shwu Wu; Chun- Lan Huang; Tzu-Yun Chang; Lan-ten Lan	Stadium: Thammasat Stadium

11 December Asian Games	India	0–16	China	Pathum Thani, Thailand
14:00 UTC+07:00		RSSSF		Stadium: Thammasat Stadium

== 1999 ==
7 November AFC Women C	North Korea	7–0	India	Iloilo City, Philippines
	Ri Hyang-ok 8', 20'; Pak Jong-ae (?), 55'; Jin Pyol-hui 77'; Oh Kum-ran 86'; ?	RSSSF		Stadium: Iloilo Sports Complex

9 November AFC Women C	India	3–0	Malaysia	Iloilo City, Philippines
	Tababi Devi; Sujata Kar			Stadium: Iloilo Sports Complex

13 November AFC Women C	India	0–3	Vietnam	Iloilo City, Philippines
		RSSSF		Stadium: Iloilo Sports Complex

15 November AFC Women C	Chinese Taipei	2–0	India	Barotac Nuevo, Philippines
		RSSSF		Stadium: Barotac Nuevo Plaza Field
