= Football at the 1993 South Asian Games =

1993 Men's South Asian Games Football Tournament
Tournament details
- Host country: Bangladesh
- Dates: 20–26 December
- Teams: 6 (from 1 confederation)
- Venues: 2 (in 1 host city)

Final positions
- Champions: Nepal (2nd title)
- Runners-up: India
- Third place: Sri Lanka

Tournament statistics
- Matches played: 8
- Goals scored: 18 (2.25 per match)
- Top scorer(s): (Pakistan) Muhammad Nauman Khan (India) Tejinder Kumar (3 goals each)

The men's football tournament at the 1993 South Asian Games was held from 20 to 26 December in Bangladesh.

== Fixtures and results ==
=== Group A ===
Pos	Team	Pld	W	D	L	GF	GA	GD	Pts	Qualification
1	Nepal	2	1	1	0	1	0	+1	4	Gold medal match
2	Maldives	2	0	2	0	0	0	0	2	Bronze medal match
3	Bangladesh	2	0	1	1	0	1	−1	1	

Source: RSSSF
Rules for classification: 1) points; 2) goal difference; 3) goals scored; 4) head-to-head result.
20 December 1993

Bangladesh	0–0	Maldives
	Report

Mirpur Stadium, Dhaka
Referee: Mohdeen Arif (Sri Lanka)

22 December 1993

Bangladesh	0–1	Nepal
	Report	Milan Hada 60'

Dhaka Stadium, Dhaka
Referee: Gazi Mohammad Arif (Pakistan)

24 December 1993

Nepal	0–0	Maldives
	Report

Dhaka Stadium, Dhaka
Referee: Sagar Kumar Sen (India)

=== Group B ===
Pos	Team	Pld	W	D	L	GF	GA	GD	Pts	Qualification
1	India	2	1	1	0	4	2	+2	4	Gold medal match
2	Sri Lanka	2	1	0	1	2	3	−1	3	Bronze medal match
3	Pakistan	2	0	1	1	3	4	−1	1	

Source: RSSSF
Rules for classification: 1) points; 2) goal difference; 3) goals scored; 4) head-to-head result.
20 December 1993

Sri Lanka	2–1	Pakistan
S Ranaweera 32', 35'	Report	Nauman 18'

Mirpur Stadium, Dhaka
Referee: Russamee Jindamai (Thailand)

22 December 1993

India	2–0	Sri Lanka
Tejinder Kumar 74'; Bhupinder Thakur 87'	Report

Dhaka Stadium, Dhaka
Referee: Ahmed Hakeem Ibrahim (UAE)

24 December 1993

India	2–2	Pakistan
Bhupinder Thakur 43'; Tejinder Kumar 85'	Report	Nauman 49', 58'

Dhaka Stadium, Dhaka
Referee: Rafiqul Islam (Bangladesh)

== Medal Matches ==
=== Bronze medal match ===
26 December 1993

Sri Lanka	3–1	Maldives
Chaminda Steinwall 54'; Anton Silva 34' (pen.)	Report	Ismail Anil 73'

Mirpur Stadium, Dhaka

=== Gold medal match ===
26 December 1993

Nepal	2–2 (a.e.t.)	India
Umesh Pradhan 65'; Mani Shah 87'	Report	Tejinder Kumar 26'; Vijayan 81'
Penalties
Rajesh Manandhar (penalty scored); Raju Kaji (penalty scored); Mani Shah (penalty scored); Basanta Raj Gurung (penalty scored)	4–3	Sathyan (penalty scored); Subir Ghosh (penalty scored); Bhupinder Thakur (penalty scored); Ansari Ahmed (penalty missed)

Mirpur Stadium, Dhaka
Referee: Russamee Jindamai (Thailand)

== Winner ==
Men's Football at the 1993 South Asian Games

Nepal
Second title

== Goalscorers ==
There have been 18 goals scored in 8 matches, for an average of 2.25 goals per match.

3 goals

- (Pakistan) Muhammad Nauman Khan
- (India) Tejinder Kumar

2 goals

- (Sri Lanka) S Ranaweera
- (Sri Lanka) Chaminda Steinwall
- (India) Bhupinder Thakur

1 goal

- (India) IM Vijayan
- (Nepal) Milan Hada
- (Nepal) Umesh Pradhan
- (Nepal) Mani Shah
- (Sri Lanka) Anton Silva
- (Maldives) Ismail Anil
