= Dheri Alladand =

Village in Malakand District, Pakistan

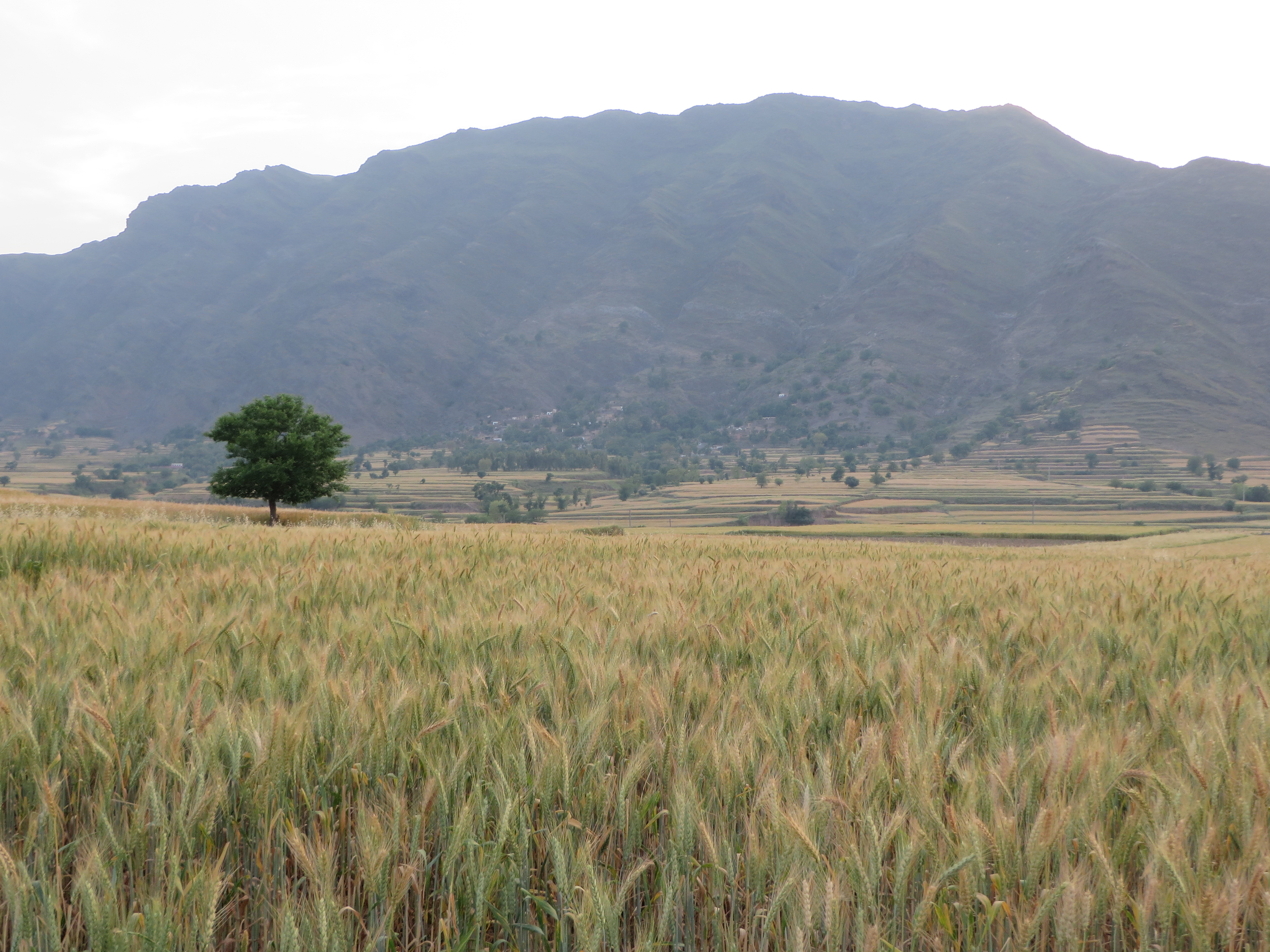
Alladand Dheri

Alladand Dheri is a village which consists of two union councils (Alladand and Dheri) in Swat Ranizai Tehsil of Malakand District of Pakistan. Alladand Dheri is situated in the middle of Malakand, known for its history, natural environment and hospitality. It is considered the oldest home of Yousufzai tribe when they migrated from Afghanistan and settled in Alladand Dheri. People of Alladand Dheri are entirely Pashtuns of the sub tribe Ranizai Yousafzai.Ranizai sub tribe have many sub khels but in Alladand dheri Ali khel sub khel of the ranizai are residing here and some non-pashtoon tribe. Ali khel is further divided in 6 sub khels [ Azi khel, Mali khel, Fateh khel, Amir khan khel, Shahab khel, Aidal Khel ]. which are very important in Malakand Ranizai territory. Every khel have 2 main houses Called ( Bar Kor, Koz kor ) For example Azi khel have two houses Named (Malak Kori) And (Sheikh kori) and in Azi khel there is another important house (Kachu Khel). Aidal Khel have another khel called (Miras Khel). Fateh Khel Also have Two Houses ( Bar Malak kor, Koz Malak kor). And we have many records of Khans and Malaks of Ali khel which are mostly from Kachu khel One is Alladand Khan and Second dheri khan. In last 18 century we also have a record of Malak Ismail khan of Fateh khel Bar Malak kor in some documents he was also called Dheri khan.

Alladand is fertile and is irrigated by River Swat. It shares a major part of supply of fruits and vegetables from Malakand District to whole Pakistan.
