= Khikmat Khashimov =

Uzbekistani footballer (born 1979)

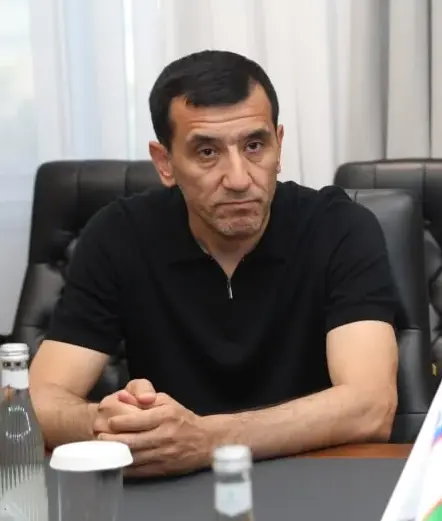
- Khashimov(2026)

Personal information
- Full name: Hikmatjon Husanovich Hoshimov
- Date of birth: 12 November 1979 (age 46)
- Place of birth: Tashkent, Uzbekistan
- Height: 1.85 m (6 ft 1 in)
- Position: Midfielder

Youth career
- Dustlik

Senior career*
Years	Team	Apps	(Gls)
1998–2001	MHSK		
2001–2003	Sogdiana Jizzakh	43	(4)
2003–2017	Metallurg Bekabad	315	(31)
2005	→ Lokomotiv Tashkent (loan)	20	(0)
2006	→ Andijon (loan)	30	(2)
2007	→ Nasaf Qarshi (loan)	29	(3)
2010	→ Bunyodkor (loan)	12	(0)

International career
2007–2008	Uzbekistan	13	(1)
- * Club domestic league appearances and goals

Khikmat Khashimov (Uzbek: Hikmatjon Husanovich Hoshimov; born 12 November 1979) is an Uzbek footballer who played as a midfielder primarily for Metallurg Bekabad and also the Uzbekistan nation team. He is the father of footballer Abdukodir Khusanov who plays for the national team and Manchester City.

== Club career ==
Khashimov's football career began at the club MHSK Tashkent. In 2001, he made his debut in the colors of Uzbekistan in the first division. Later that same year he went to Sogdiana. In 2003–2004 he played in Metallurg Bekabad and in the years 2005–2006 in Lokomotiv. In 2007, he moved to Nasaf Karshi, and in 2010 he returned to Metallurg Bekabad.

== International career ==
Khashimov debuted for the national team of Uzbekistan in 2007. In the same year he was appointed by coach Rauf Inileev to the squad for the 2007 Asian Cup. He played in one game against Iran (1–2).

=== Goals for national team ===
Date	Venue	Opponent	Score	Result	Competition
24 March 2007	Taipei, Taiwan	Chinese Taipei	1–0	Won	Friendly
