= Ýusup Orazmämmedow =

Turkmenistan footballer

Ýusup Orazmämmedov
Personal information
- Date of birth: 1986 (age 39–40)
- Place of birth: Turkmen SSR, Soviet Union

Team information
- Current team: FC Merw

International career
Years	Team	Apps	(Gls)
2008–present	Turkmenistan		

Ýusup Orazmämmedov is a professional Turkmen football player. He currently plays for FC Merw from Mary.

== International Career Statistics ==
=== Goals for Senior National Team ===
#	Date	Venue	Opponent	Score	Result	Competition
	August 3, 2008	Hyderabad, India	India	1–2	Lost	2008 AFC Challenge Cup
