= Jo Paul Ancheri =

Indian footballer (born 1975)

Personal information
- Date of birth: 2 August 1975 (age 51)
- Place of birth: Thrissur, Kerala, India
- Height: 1.75 m (5 ft 9 in)
- Position: Forward

Team information
- Current team: Thrissur Magic (assistant coach)

Senior career*
Years	Team	Apps	(Gls)
1992–93	SBT	38	(16)
1993–94	Mohun Bagan	42	(24)
1994–97	JCT Football Club	116	(46)
1997–98	FC Cochin	34	(18)
1998–99	Mohun Bagan	44	(14)
1999–01	FC Cochin	72	(36)
2001–02	East Bengal	40	(26)
2002–04	JCT Football Club	66	(32)
2004–05	Mohun Bagan	44	(16)

International career
1992-1996	India U23	24	(4)
1992–2004	India	41	(11)

Managerial career
- 2012–2022: Eagles FC
- 2024–2025: Forca Kochi FC (assistant)
- 2025–2026: Thrissur Magic (assistant)
- 2026: Odisha (assistant)
- 2026–: Thrissur Magic (assistant)
- * Club domestic league appearances and goals

Jo Paul Ancheri (born 2 August 1975) is an Indian professional football manager and former player who is currently the assistant coach of Super League Kerala club Thrissur Magic.

He also had captained the India national football team. He was named the AIFF Player of the Year by the All India Football Federation in 1994 and 2001. He recently worked as a Malayalam commentator and pundit on Star Sports Malayalam with the leading commentator Shaiju Damodaran. He is currently assistant coach of Indian Super League club Odisha.

== Club career ==
Born in Thrissur, Kerala, Ancheri began his professional career in 1992 playing for State Bank of Travancore. He went on to play for many leading football clubs including Mohun Bagan, JCT Mills, FC Kochin, and East Bengal. He was a versatile player who could play in any position including defender, defensive midfielder, midfielder, and striker. With JCT Mills Phagwara, he won the 1996–97 National Football League.

== International career ==
Ancheri made his senior international debut for India against Bangladesh on 14 September 1994 in a 4–2 win, when he scored a goal. Ancheri was also a member of the Indian team for the Nehru Gold Cup in Calcutta, and of the under-23 side, which took part in the pre-Olympic tournament. He later suffered a knee injury for the rest of the season and came back with the colours of FC Kochin in 1997.

Ancheri played in a number of tournaments such as FIFA World Cup qualifiers, the SAFF Championship, and the South Asian Games, and helped the team win the South Asian Football Federation Cup in 1999. He was part of the Syed Naeemuddin-managed Indian team that participated in the 1998 Asian Games in Bangkok and reached the second round.

With India, he appeared in the 2002 World Cup Qualifiers, when India defeated teams like United Arab Emirates, Brunei and Yemen. India secured 11 points from 6 matches, the same as Yemen, but finished behind them due to an inferior goal difference. In that year, Ancheri was part of the Bhaichung Bhutia-led Indian team that won the LG Cup, defeating the host nation Vietnam 3–2. He later appeared in the 2003 Afro-Asian Games, when India finished as runners-up behind Uzbekistan.

== Coaching career ==
In August 2025, he was appointed assistant coach of Super League Kerala club Thrissur Magic.

== International goals ==
List of international goals scored by Jo Paul Ancheri Scores and results list India's goal tally first
No.	Date	Venue	Opponent	Score	Result	Competition
1.	14 September 1994	Khalifa International Stadium, Doha, Qatar	Bangladesh	2–0	4–2	1994 Qatar Independence Cup
2.	21 September 1994	Khalifa International Stadium, Doha, Qatar	Oman	—N/a	1–4	1994 Qatar Independence Cup
3.	7 September 1997	Dasarath Rangasala Stadium, Kathmandu, Nepal	Maldives	2–0	2–2	1997 SAFF Gold Cup
4.	13 September 1997	Dasarath Rangasala Stadium, Kathmandu, Nepal	Maldives	1–0	5–1	1997 SAFF Gold Cup
5.	24 November 1999	Tahnoun bin Mohammed Stadium, Abu Dhabi, UAE	Uzbekistan	2–1	2–3	2000 AFC Asian Cup qualification
6.	29 July 2000	Filbert Street, Leicester, England	Bangladesh	1–0	1–0	Friendly
7.	4 May 2001	Althawra Sports City Stadium, Sanaa, Yemen	Yemen	1–1	3–3	2002 FIFA World Cup qualification
8.	4 May 2001	Althawra Sports City Stadium, Sanaa, Yemen	Yemen	2–2	3–3	2002 FIFA World Cup qualification
9.	11 May 2001	Hassanal Bolkiah National Stadium, Bandar Seri Begawan, Brunei	Brunei	1–0	1–0	2002 FIFA World Cup qualification
10.	20 May 2001	Bangalore Football Stadium, Bangalore, India	Brunei	4–0	5–0	2002 FIFA World Cup qualification
11.	3 June 2004	Gelora Bung Karno Stadium, Jakarta, Indonesia	Indonesia	1–1	1–1	Friendly

== Honours ==
JCT Mills

- National Football League: 1996–97
- Indian Federation Cup: 1996
- Durand Cup: 1996

FC Kochin

- Durand Cup: 1997
- IFA Shield: runner-up 1997
- Kerala State Championship: 1997

Mohun Bagan

- Indian Federation Cup: 1998
- IFA Shield: 1998, 1999

East Bengal

- IFA Shield: 2001
- Durand Cup: 2001, 2002

India

- SAFF Championship: 1997, 1999, 2005; runner-up: 1995; third place: 2003
- South Asian Games Gold medal: 1995; Bronze medal: 1999
- Afro-Asian Games silver medal: 2003

India U-23

- LG Cup: 2002

Maharashtra

- Santosh Trophy runner-up: 1999–2000

Individual

- AIFF Player of the Year: 1994, 2001

== See also ==
- List of India international footballers
- List of India national football team captains

== Bibliography ==
- Majumdar, Boria; Bandyopadhyay, Kausik (2006). A Social History Of Indian Football: Striving To Score. Routledge. ISBN 9780415348355. Archived from the original on 29 June 2021.
- Basu, Jaydeep (2003). Stories from Indian Football. UBS Publishers' Distributors. ISBN 9788174764546. Archived from the original on 11 October 2022.
- Sarkar, Dhiman (25 March 2018). "India's football past gasping for survival". hindustantimes.com. Kolkata: Hindustan Times. Archived from the original on 6 January 2022.
