= Huang Yong (footballer) =

Chinese footballer

Personal information
- Date of birth: 26 May 1978 (age 48)
- Place of birth: Changchun, Jilin, China
- Height: 1.70 m (5 ft 7 in)
- Position: Midfielder

Youth career
- 1989–1992: Shenyang Youth
- 1993–1998: → Jianlibao Youth (loan)

Senior career*
Years	Team	Apps	(Gls)
1998–2003	Bayi Football Team	86	(16)
2004–2007	Shanghai COSCO Sanlin	81	(3)
2009–2010	Tianjin Songjiang	14	(3)

International career
2000–2001	China	16	(0)

Managerial career
- 2009: Tianjin Songjiang (player-assistant coach)
- 2010-2012: Shenyang Shenbei (assistant)
- 2012: Shenyang Shenbei (interim)
- 2013: Changchun Huaxin Women (assistant)
- 2014-2015: China Women (assistant)
- 2015: Guangxi Longguida
- 2016: Shenyang Dongjin
- 2017: Yanbian Beiguo
- 2018-2019: Jiangsu Yancheng Dingli
- 2019: Jiangsu Yancheng Dingli (assistant)
- 2019-2022: Jiangxi Beidamen
- 2022: Fuzhou Hengxing (assistant)
- 2023: Binzhou Huilong
- 2023-2024: Quanzhou Yassin
- 2025-: Nanning Dongfang Juding
Medal record
Men's football
Representing China
Asian Games
Bronze medal – third place	1998 Bangkok	Football
- * Club domestic league appearances and goals

Huang Yong (Chinese: 黄勇, born 26 May 1978 in Changchun, Jilin) is a Chinese international former football midfielder who played for Bayi Football Team, Shanghai COSCO Sanlin and Tianjin Songjiang while also representing China in the 2000 Asian Cup.

== Playing career ==
Huang Yong was born in Changchun, Jilin while his father was serving for the Chinese military. His family would settle within Shenyang and he would join the Shenyang youth team where he was selected to participate in a five-year training programme sponsored by Jianlibao to be sent to Brazil for a newly organized youth football team. On his return to China he would join top tier and military affiliated Bayi Football Team in the 1998 league season. After five years with the club they disbanded due to financial constraints. Huang Yong moved to top tier club Shanghai COSCO Sanlin, and in 2006 moved to Xi'an with the team. At the beginning of 2008, the 29-year-old Huang Yong was listed by the club, but no team expressed interest, and he did not appear on the first team list again. Instead, he returned to Shenyang to open a restaurant. Huang Yong came out of retirement when he joined third tier football club Tianjin Songjiang in the 2009 league season as a player/ coach and was reunited with his former teammate at Jianlibao Youth, Zhang Xiaorui.

== Coaching career ==
With the introduction of Patrick de Wilde as Head coach at Tianjin Songjiang, Huang Yong was relieved of his position as a coach within the club. He would join Tianjin Runyulong within the 2010 league season as an assistant coach before they would move to Shenyang and rename themselves Shenyang Shenbei. On 18 June 2012 he came in as a caretaker manager for Shenyang Shenbei. On 10 July 2012 the club brought in Liu Zhicai on a permanent basis.
