= 2008 AFC Challenge Cup =

Tournament details
- Host country: India
- Dates: 30 July – 13 August
- Venues: 3 (in 2 host cities)

Final positions
- Champions: India (1st title)
- Runners-up: Tajikistan
- Third place: North Korea
- Fourth place: Myanmar

Tournament statistics
- Matches played: 16
- Goals scored: 41 (2.56 per match)
- Attendance: 15,900 (994 per match)
- Top scorer(s): (North Korea) Pak Song-chol (6 goals)
- Best player: (India) Bhaichung Bhutia

The 2008 AFC Challenge Cup football tournament was organised by AFC and was hosted by India. The tournament was played from 30 July – 13 August 2008. India won the final against Tajikistan. India was also the winner of the fair play award and the India captain Bhaichung Bhutia won the most valuable player award.

Chinese Taipei was originally designated the host, but could not guarantee it would meet the AFC's standards for hosting the tournament. Thailand was first chosen as host but withdrew due to lack of time to prepare. The Philippines also was to take over as host with matches to be played in Bacolod in May 2008 but the plan failed to materialized.

The winners of the 2008 and 2010 competitions will qualify directly for the 2011 Asian Cup. As a result, India qualified for the AFC Asian Cup, the first time since 1984. This competition is exclusive to members of the emerging nations class of the AFC. However, in the previous edition, Bangladesh and India were invited from the developing nations class – Bangladesh actually hosting the tournament, and India sending their under-20 team. India and Bangladesh have again been invited for the 2008 edition of the tournament, along with North Korea, Myanmar and Turkmenistan who are also a part of the developing nations class.

Laos withdrew from the competition on 2 May 2008. Palestine withdrew from the competition on 14 May 2008.

Due to the poor conditions of the pitch at Lal Bahadur Shastri Stadium, the AFC moved the majority of the matches to another venue. It was decided that ten matches would be played at the Gachibowli Athletic Stadium, and two at the LBS Stadium. Due to incessant rains in Hyderabad in the days leading up to the final, the AFC changed the venue of the final and the third place play-off to the Ambedkar Stadium in New Delhi.

== Tournament ==
Qualification saw the top team from each of the four qualification groups qualify for the tournament proper, bringing the total number of participating teams in the centralized finals to eight. In addition, India (tournament hosts), Korea DPR, Turkmenistan and Myanmar qualified automatically. Mongolia and Timor-Leste decided not to take part.

=== Seeding ===
Bold Type – qualified teams, Italics – withdrawn teams

1. North Korea
2. Turkmenistan
3. India
4. Myanmar
5. Tajikistan
6. Sri Lanka
7. Nepal
8. Kyrgyzstan
9. Palestine (Withdrew 14 May 2008)
10. Chinese Taipei
11. Bangladesh
12. Brunei
13. Pakistan
14. Cambodia
15. Philippines
16. Afghanistan
17. Bhutan
18. Macau
19. Guam
20. Laos (Withdrew 2 May 2008)

== Venues ==
Hyderabad		2008 AFC Challenge Cup is located in India	New Delhi
Gachibowli Athletic Stadium	Lal Bahadur Shastri Stadium	2008 AFC Challenge Cup is located in India	Ambedkar Stadium
Capacity: 30,000	Capacity: 30,000	2008 AFC Challenge Cup is located in India	Capacity: 20,000

== Qualification ==
The following teams qualified for the final tournament:

- India (Host)
- North Korea (Automatic Qualifier)
- Turkmenistan (Automatic Qualifier)
- Myanmar (Automatic Qualifier)
- Sri Lanka (Winner Qualification Group A)
- Tajikistan (Winner Qualification Group B)
- Afghanistan (Winner Qualification Group C)
- Nepal (Winner Qualification Group D)

== Officials ==
Referees

- (Bangladesh) Tayeb Shamsuzzaman
- (Japan) Masaaki Toma
- (Maldives) Ali Saleem
- (United Arab Emirates) Khalid Al-Senan
- (Uzbekistan) Valentin Kovalenko
- (Vietnam) Võ Minh Trí

Assistant Referees

- (Australia) Silk Denis John
- (China) Han Wei
- (India) Cheruvathur Kurian Shaji
- (Malaysia) Saadon Bin Mohamad
- (Oman) Al Qasmi Ali Ahmed Ali
- (Qatar) Mohammad Jaber A. H. Dharman
- (Singapore) Chia Eng Wah John
- (Syria) Tamam Hamdoun

== Group stage ==
All times are Indian Standard Time (IST) – UTC+5:30

Key to colours in group tables
Top two placed teams advance to the semi-finals

=== Tie-breaking criteria ===
Where two or more teams end the group stage with the same number of points, their ranking is determined by the following criteria:

1. points earned in the matches between the teams concerned;
2. goal difference in the matches between the teams concerned;
3. number of goals scored in the group matches between the teams concerned;
4. goal difference in all group matches;
5. number of goals scored in all group matches;
6. kicks from the penalty mark (if only two teams are level and they are both on the field of play);
7. fewer yellow and red cards received in the group matches;
8. drawing of lots by the organising committee.

=== Group A ===
Team	Pld	W	D	L	GF	GA	GD	Pts
India (H)	3	2	1	0	4	2	+2	7
Tajikistan	3	1	2	0	5	1	+4	5
Turkmenistan	3	1	1	1	6	2	+4	4
Afghanistan	3	0	0	3	0	10	−10	0

Source: Report
(H) Hosts
30 July 2008
16:00

Turkmenistan	0–0	Tajikistan
	Report

Gachibowli Athletic Stadium, Hyderabad
Attendance: 150
Referee: Valentin Kovalenko (Uzbekistan)

30 July 2008
18:30

India	1–0	Afghanistan
Lawrence 90+2'	Report

Gachibowli Athletic Stadium, Hyderabad
Attendance: 300
Referee: Masaaki Toma (Japan)

1 August 2008
16:00

Tajikistan	1–1	India
Rabiev 11'	Report	Tuychiev 61' (o.g.)

Gachibowli Athletic Stadium, Hyderabad
Attendance: 350
Referee: Tayeb Shamsuzzaman (Bangladesh)

1 August 2008
18:30

Afghanistan	0–5	Turkmenistan
	Report	Öwekow 1', 41', 77', 80'; Krendelev 23'

Gachibowli Athletic Stadium, Hyderabad
Attendance: 100
Referee: Ali Saleem (Maldives)

3 August 2008
18:30

Turkmenistan	1–2	India
Orazmämmedow 84'	Report	Bhutia 54', 80'

Gachibowli Athletic Stadium, Hyderabad
Attendance: 1,000
Referee: Khalid Al-Senan (UAE)

3 August 2008
18:30

Afghanistan	0–4	Tajikistan
	Report	Rabiev 14', 44', 56'; Tukhtasunov 39'

Lal Bahadur Shastri Stadium, Hyderabad
Attendance: 150
Referee: Vo Minh Tri (Vietnam)

=== Group B ===
Team	Pld	W	D	L	GF	GA	GD	Pts
North Korea	3	3	0	0	5	0	+5	9
Myanmar	3	2	0	1	6	2	+4	6
Nepal	3	1	0	2	3	4	−1	3
Sri Lanka	3	0	0	3	1	9	−8	0

Source: Report
31 July 2008
16:00

North Korea	3–0	Sri Lanka
Madushka Peiris 5' (o.g.); Pak Song-chol 9', 27'	Report

Gachibowli Athletic Stadium, Hyderabad
Attendance: 100
Referee: Vo Minh Tri (Vietnam)

31 July 2008
18:30

Myanmar	3–0	Nepal
Yazar Win Thein 66'; Myo Min Tun 76'; Soe Myat Min 86'	Report

Gachibowli Athletic Stadium, Hyderabad
Attendance: 150
Referee: Khalid Al-Senan (UAE)

2 August 2008
16:00

Sri Lanka	1–3	Myanmar
Jayasuriya 51'	Report	Soe Myat Min 47'; Yan Paing 70'; Si Thu Win 85'

Gachibowli Athletic Stadium, Hyderabad
Attendance: 100
Referee: Valentin Kovalenko (Uzbekistan)

2 August 2008
18:30

Nepal	0–1	North Korea
	Report	Pak Song-chol 39'

Gachibowli Athletic Stadium, Hyderabad
Attendance: 100
Referee: Masaaki Toma (Japan)

4 August 2008
18:30

North Korea	1–0	Myanmar
Ro Hak-su 15'	Report

Lal Bahadur Shastri Stadium, Hyderabad
Attendance: 100
Referee: Tayeb Shamsuzzaman (Bangladesh)

4 August 2008
18:30

Nepal	3–0	Sri Lanka
Sahukhala 14'; J.M. Rai 55'; K.C. Anjan 68'	Report

Gachibowli Athletic Stadium, Hyderabad
Attendance: 200
Referee: Ali Saleem (Maldives)

== Knockout stage ==
Semi-finals
7 August – Hyderabad
India	1
Myanmar	0
7 August – Hyderabad
North Korea	0
Tajikistan	1

Final
13 August – New Delhi
India	4
Tajikistan	1
Third place
13 August – New Delhi
North Korea	4
Myanmar	0

=== Semi-finals ===
7 August 2008
16:00

India	1–0	Myanmar
Chhetri 82'	Report

Gachibowli Athletic Stadium, Hyderabad
Attendance: 1,500
Referee: Tayeb Shamsuzzaman (Bangladesh)

7 August 2008
19:30

North Korea	0–1	Tajikistan
	Report	Mukhidinov 39'

Gachibowli Athletic Stadium, Hyderabad
Attendance: 600
Referee: Masaaki Toma (Japan)

=== Third place play-off ===
13 August 2008
16:00

Myanmar	0–4	North Korea
	Report	Pak Song-chol 10', 12', 44' (pen.); Ro Hak-su 53'

Ambedkar Stadium, New Delhi
Attendance: 1,000
Referee: Khalid Al-Senan (UAE)

=== Final ===
13 August 2008
19:00

India	4–1	Tajikistan
Chhetri 9', 23', 75'; Bhutia 18'	AIFF	Fatkhuloev 44'

Ambedkar Stadium, New Delhi
Attendance: 10,000
Referee: Valentin Kovalenko (Uzbekistan)

== Winner ==
2008 AFC Challenge Cup champions

India
First title

== Awards ==
Fair Play Award	Golden Shoe	Most Valuable Player
India	(North Korea) Pak Song-chol	(India) Bhaichung Bhutia

== Goalscorers ==
6 goals

- (North Korea) Pak Song-chol

4 goals

- (India) Sunil Chhetri
- (Tajikistan) Yusuf Rabiev
- (Turkmenistan) Guwançmuhammet Öwekow

3 goals

- (India) Bhaichung Bhutia

2 goals

- (Myanmar) Soe Myat Min
- (North Korea) Ro Hak-su

1 goal

- (India) Climax Lawrence
- (Myanmar) Myo Min Tun
- (Myanmar) Si Thu Win
- (Myanmar) Yan Paing
- (Myanmar) Yazar Win Thein

1 goal

- (Nepal) K.C. Anjan
- (Nepal) Ju Manu Rai
- (Nepal) Santosh Sahukhala
- (Sri Lanka) Kasun Jayasuriya
- (Tajikistan) Fatkhullo Fatkhuloev
- (Tajikistan) Dzhomikhon Mukhidinov
- (Tajikistan) Davronjon Tukhtasunov
- (Turkmenistan) Vyacheslav Krendelev
- (Turkmenistan) Ýusup Orazmämmedow

Own goal

- (Sri Lanka) Madushka Peiris (playing against Korea DPR)
- (Tajikistan) Alisher Tuychiev (playing against India)

== Team statistics ==
This table shows all team performance. Matches that ended in a penalty shoot out are counted as draws

Pos	Team	Pld	W	D	L	Pts	GF	GA	GD
Reached the knockout stage
1	India	5	4	1	0	13	9	3	+6
2	Tajikistan	5	2	2	1	8	7	5	+2
3	North Korea	5	4	0	1	12	9	1	+8
4	Myanmar	5	2	0	3	6	6	7	-1
Eliminated in the group stage
5	Turkmenistan	3	1	1	1	4	6	2	+4
6	Nepal	3	1	0	2	3	3	4	−1
7	Sri Lanka	3	0	0	3	0	0	9	−8
8	Afghanistan	3	0	0	3	0	0	10	−10
