= V. P. Sathyan =

Indian footballer (1965–2006)

Personal information
- Date of birth: 29 April 1965
- Place of birth: Mekkunnu, Kannur, Kerala, India
- Date of death: 18 July 2006 (aged 41)
- Place of death: Chennai, Tamil Nadu, India
- Positions: Full-back; defensive midfielder

Youth career
- 1982: Spirited Youth Club

Senior career*
Years	Team	Apps	(Gls)
1983	Lucky Star Club		
1984–1992	Kerala Police		
1992–1993	Mohun Bagan		
1994–1995	Kerala Police		
1996	Kerala Police		

International career
1986–1995	India	16	(4)

Managerial career
- 2001: Indian Bank (football club)
- 2002: India (assistant)
Medal record
Men's football
Representing India
South Asian Games
Gold medal – first place	1995 Madras	Team competition
Silver medal – second place	1993 Dhaka	Team competition
- * Club domestic league appearances and goals

Vatta Parambath Sathyan (29 April 1965 – 18 July 2006), popularly known as V. P. Sathyan, was a former Indian professional footballer who played the centre back position. He was the captain of the India national football team from 1991 to 1995. He was named the 1992 AIFF Player of the Year.

== Career ==
Sathyan started his career in 1983 representing Kerala in the Santosh Trophy National Championship. He attended the South Zone camp for Indian probables under Amar Bahadur in 1985. Strongly built and a capable defender, he joined the national team for the 1985 SAF Games in Dhaka. By 1986, he had represented the country in the Nehru Cup in Thiruvananthapuram and in the Seoul Asian Games.

Sathyan was a key member of the Kerala Police Football team which won the Federation Cup twice in 1989–90 and in 1990–91. He went from the Kerala Police team to Kolkata in 1991, where he played for two seasons, one in Mohammedan Sporting Club and one in Mohun Bagan before returning to the Kerala Police again and then moving to Indian Bank in 1996. Sathyan served first as a player from 1995 to 2001 and then as the team's coach.

In 1991, Sathyan became the captain of the Indian team for the World Cup qualifiers in Beirut and Seoul. He led the Indian team to a gold medal in the 1995 SAF Games in Madras (Present Chennai). He also led Kerala to the Santosh Trophy title in 1992.

Sathyan was the AIFF player of the year in 1992. As a coach, he was an assistant to Stephen Constantine in 2002 when India toured South Korea.

=== International goals ===
Scores and results list India's goal tally first.

Goal	Date	Venue	Opponent	Score	Result	Competition
1.	30 January 1993	Jawaharlal Nehru Stadium, Chennai, India	Cameroon	1–2	2–2	1993 Nehru Cup
2.	7 May 1993	Bourj Hammoud Stadium, Beirut, Lebanon	Lebanon	2–2	2–2	1994 FIFA World Cup Qualifier
3.	15 May 1993	Bourj Hammoud Stadium, Beirut, Lebanon	Bahrain	1–2	1–2	1994 FIFA World Cup Qualifier
4.	13 June 1993	Seoul Olympic Stadium, Seoul, South Korea	Hong Kong	1–0	3–1	1994 FIFA World Cup Qualifier

== Personal life ==
VP Sathyan was born on 29 April 1965 in Mekkunnu near Chokli, Kannur district, to Vatta Parambath Gopalan Nair and Narayani Amma. He was married to Anitha, who is now working as a clerk at the Sports Council Office in Kozhikode and had a daughter Athira, who got married in 2017. Sathyan took his own life by jumping in front of an oncoming train in Chennai on 18 July 2006 because he was suffering from depression due to the lack of recognition/credits/awards he received, and the loss of income after retirement from his football career.

== In popular culture ==
The 2018 Indian biographical film Captain is based on Sathyan's life. Jayasurya portrayed Sathyan in the film, while Anu Sithara played his wife, Anitha. In 2019, Jayasurya won the Kerala State Film Award for Best Actor for his performance in Captain.

== Honours ==
India

- SAFF Championship: 1993; runner-up: 1995
- South Asian Games Gold medal: 1985; Silver medal: 1993

Individual

- AIFF Indian Player of the Year: 1995
