= North Korea national football team results (2010–2019) =

This article provides details of international football games played by the North Korea national football team from 2010 to 2019.

== Results ==
=== 2010 ===
2 January 2010 9th International Friendship Tournament	Iran	1–0	North Korea	Doha, Qatar
				Stadium: Jassim bin Hamad Stadium

17 February 2010 2010 AFC Challenge Cup	North Korea	1–1	Turkmenistan	Colombo, Sri Lanka
	Ryang Yong-gi 51'		Garadanow 36'	Stadium: Sugathadasa Stadium; Attendance: 400; Referee: Chaiya Mahapab (Thailand)

19 February 2010 2010 AFC Challenge Cup	Kyrgyzstan	0–4	North Korea	Colombo, Sri Lanka
			Pak Song-chol 29'; Pak Kwang-ryong 47'; Choe Myong-ho 65'; Ri Chol-myong 68'	Stadium: Sugathadasa Stadium; Attendance: 300; Referee: Andre El Haddad (Lebanon)

21 February 2010 2010 AFC Challenge Cup	North Korea	3–0	India	Colombo, Sri Lanka
	Ryang Yong-gi 36', 72'; Choe Chol-man 57'			Stadium: Sugathadasa Stadium; Attendance: 300; Referee: Tan Hai (China PR)

24 February 2010 2010 AFC Challenge Cup	North Korea	5–0	Myanmar	Colombo, Sri Lanka
	Choe Myong-ho 6'; Choe Chol-man 12', 73'; Pak Song-chol 13'; Kim Seong-yong 85'			Stadium: Sugathadasa Stadium; Attendance: 400; Referee: Mukhtar Al Yarimi (Yemen)

27 February 2010 2010 AFC Challenge Cup final	Turkmenistan	1–1 (a.e.t.) (4–5 p)	North Korea	Colombo, Sri Lanka
	Şamyradow 33'		Ryang Yong-gi 75'	Stadium: Sugathadasa Stadium; Attendance: 3,000; Referee: Alireza Faghani (Iran)
	Penalties
	Öwekow (penalty scored); Garadanow (penalty missed); Şamyradow (penalty scored); Rejepow (penalty scored); Nurmyradow (penalty scored); Amanow (penalty missed)		(penalty scored) Pak Song-chol; (penalty scored) Ryang Yong-gi; (penalty scored) Chae Tu-yong; (penalty scored) Pak Yong-jin; (penalty missed) Ri Chol-myong; (penalty scored) Ri Kwang-hyok

4 March 2010 Friendly	Venezuela	1–1	North Korea	San Felipe Venezuela
				Stadium: Estadio Florentino Oropeza

6 March 2010 Friendly	Venezuela	2–1	North Korea	Puerto la Cruz, Venezuela
				Stadium: Estadio José Antonio Anzoátegui

17 March 2010 Friendly	Mexico	2–1	North Korea	Torreón, Mexico
	Blanco 50'; J. Hernández 68'		Choe Kum-chol 56'	Stadium: Estadio Corona; Referee: Roberto Moreno (Panama)

22 April 2010 Friendly	North Korea	0–0	South Africa	Wiesbaden, Germany
				Stadium: BRITA-Arena; Attendance: 628

15 May 2010 Friendly	Paraguay	1–0	North Korea	Nyon, Switzerland
	Santa Cruz 86' (pen.)			Stadium: Centre sportif de Colovray Nyon

25 May 2010 Friendly	Greece	2–2	North Korea	Altach, Austria
	Jong Tae-se 23', 52'		Katsouranis 2'; Charisteas 49'	Stadium: Cashpoint Arena; Attendance: 3,000; Referee: Robert Schörgenhofer (Austria)

6 June 2010 Friendly	Nigeria	3–1	North Korea	Tembisa, South Africa
	Yakubu 17'; Nsofor 62'; Martins 90'		Jong Tae-Se 64'	Stadium: Makhulong Stadium; Attendance: 8,000

15 June 2010 2010 FIFA World Cup	Brazil	2–1	North Korea	Johannesburg, South Africa
	Maicon 55'; Elano 72'		Ji Yun-nam 89'	Stadium: Ellis Park Stadium; Attendance: 54,331; Referee: Viktor Kassai (Hungary)

21 June 2010 2010 FIFA World Cup	Portugal	7–0	North Korea	Cape Town, South Africa
	Meireles 29'; Simão 53'; Almeida 56'; Tiago 60', 89'; Liédson 81'; Ronaldo 87'			Stadium: Cape Town Stadium; Attendance: 63,644; Referee: Pablo Pozo (Chile)

25 June 2010 2010 FIFA World Cup	North Korea	0–3	Ivory Coast	Nelspruit, South Africa
			Y. Touré 14'; Romaric 20'; Kalou 82'	Stadium: Mbombela Stadium; Attendance: 34,763; Referee: Alberto Undiano Mallenco (Spain)

24 September 2010 Millennial Anniversary of Hanoi Tournament	Vietnam	0–0	North Korea	Hanoi, Vietnam
				Stadium: Mỹ Đình National Stadium

2 November 2010 2010 VFF SonHa Cup	North Korea	2–1	Singapore	Hanoi, Vietnam
				Stadium: Mỹ Đình National Stadium

6 November 2010 2010 VFF SonHa Cup	Vietnam	0–2	North Korea	Hanoi, Vietnam
				Stadium: Mỹ Đình National Stadium

10 November 2010 Friendly	Yemen	1–1	North Korea	Aden, Yemen

24 December 2010 Friendly	Kuwait	2–1	North Korea	6th of October, Egypt
				Stadium: Nogoom El Mostakbal Stadium

27 December 2010 Friendly	Kuwait	2–2	North Korea	6th of October, Egypt
				Stadium: Nogoom El Mostakbal Stadium

31 December 2010 Friendly	Qatar	0–1	North Korea	Doha, Qatar

=== 2011 ===
4 January 2011 Friendly	Bahrain	0–1	North Korea	Riffa, Bahrain

11 January 2011 2011 AFC Asian Cup	North Korea	0–0	United Arab Emirates	Doha, Qatar
				Stadium: Suheim bin Hamad Stadium; Attendance: 3,639; Referee: Subkhiddin Mohd Salleh (Malaysia)

15 January 2011 2011 AFC Asian Cup	Iran	1–0	North Korea	Doha, Qatar
	Ansarifard 63'			Stadium: Suheim bin Hamad Stadium; Attendance: 6,488; Referee: Nawaf Shukralla (Bahrain)

19 January 2011 2011 AFC Asian Cup	Iraq	1–0	North Korea	Al Rayyan, Qatar
	Jassim 22'			Stadium: Ahmed bin Ali Stadium; Attendance: 4,111; Referee: Subkhiddin Mohd Salleh (Malaysia)

26 March 2011 Friendly	Iraq	1–0	North Korea	Sharjah, United Arab Emirates
				Stadium: Sharjah Stadium

29 March 2011 Friendly	Jordan	1–1	North Korea	Sharjah, United Arab Emirates
				Stadium: Sharjah Stadium

7 April 2011 2012 AFC Challenge Cup qualification	North Korea	4–0	Sri Lanka	Kathmandu, Nepal
	Choe Kum-Chol 2', 47'; Ri Chol-Myong 5'; Pak Nam-Chol 21'			Stadium: Halchowk Stadium; Attendance: 2,000

9 April 2011 2012 AFC Challenge Cup qualification	Nepal	0–1	North Korea	Kathmandu, Nepal
			Jong Il-Gwan 31'	Stadium: Dasarath Stadium; Attendance: 22,000

11 April 2011 2012 AFC Challenge Cup qualification	North Korea	2–0	Afghanistan	Kathmandu, Nepal
	Choe Kum-Chol 45+1'; Ri Chol-Myong 68'			Stadium: Halchowk Stadium; Attendance: 1,000

8 June 2011 Friendly	China	2–0	North Korea	Guanshanhu, China
				Stadium: Guiyang Olympic Sports Center

10 August 2011 Friendly	Kuwait	0–0	North Korea	Kuwait City, Kuwait
				Stadium: Jaber Al-Ahmad International Stadium

2 September 2011 2014 FIFA World Cup qualification	Japan	1–0	North Korea	Saitama, Japan
	Yoshida 90+4'			Stadium: Saitama Stadium 2002; Attendance: 62,000; Referee: Ali Al Badwawi (United Arab Emirates)

6 September 2011 2014 FIFA World Cup qualification	North Korea	1–0	Tajikistan	Pyongyang, North Korea
	Pak Nam-Chol 14'			Stadium: Yanggakdo Stadium; Attendance: 28,000; Referee: Võ Minh Trí (Vietnam)

11 October 2011 2014 FIFA World Cup qualification	North Korea	0–1	Uzbekistan	Pyongyang, North Korea
			Geynrikh 26'	Stadium: Yanggakdo Stadium; Attendance: 29,000; Referee: Alireza Faghani (Iran)

11 November 2011 2014 FIFA World Cup qualification	Uzbekistan	1–0	North Korea	Tashkent, Uzbekistan
	Kapadze 48'			Stadium: Pakhtakor Markaziy Stadium; Attendance: 27,825; Referee: Andre El Haddad (Lebanon)

15 November 2011 2014 FIFA World Cup qualification	North Korea	1–0	Japan	Pyongyang, North Korea
	Pak Nam-Chol 50'			Stadium: Kim Il-sung Stadium, Pyongyang (Note: Moved from the original venue at Yanggakdo Stadium due to the poor condition of the pitch.); Attendance: 50,000; Referee: Nawaf Shukralla (Bahrain)

=== 2012 ===
17 February 2012 Friendly	Kuwait	1–1	North Korea	Changsha, China
				Stadium: Helong Sports Center Stadium

29 February 2012 2014 FIFA World Cup qualification	Tajikistan	1–1	North Korea	Khujand, Tajikistan
	Khamrakulov 61'		Jang Song-hyok 54' (pen.)	Stadium: 20 Years of Independence Stadium; Attendance: 35,000; Referee: Banjar Al-Dosari (Qatar)

9 March 2012 2012 AFC Challenge Cup	North Korea	2–0	Philippines	Kathmandu, Nepal
	Pak Nam-chol I 58'; Jang Kuk-chol 70'			Stadium: Halchowk Stadium; Attendance: 1,500; Referee: Pratap Singh (India)

11 March 2012 2012 AFC Challenge Cup	Tajikistan	0–2	North Korea	Kathmandu, Nepal
			Pak Nam-chol I 4'; Jang Kuk-chol 86'	Stadium: Halchowk Stadium; Attendance: 1,000; Referee: Yousef Al-Marzouq (Kuwait)

13 March 2012 2012 AFC Challenge Cup	North Korea	4–0	India	Kathmandu, Nepal
	Jon Kwang-ik 3'; Ri Kwang-hyok 34'; Pak Nam-chol I 59'; Ri Chol-myong 70'			Stadium: Dasarath Rangasala Stadium; Attendance: 300; Referee: Chaiya Mahapab (Thailand)

16 March 2012 2012 AFC Challenge Cup	North Korea	2–0	Palestine	Kathmandu, Nepal
	Pak Kwang-ryong 42', 68'			Stadium: Dasarath Rangasala Stadium; Attendance: 3,000; Referee: Yousef Al-Marzouq (Kuwait)

19 March 2012 2012 AFC Challenge Cup final	Turkmenistan	1–2	North Korea	Kathmandu, Nepal
	Şamyradow 2'		Jong Il-gwan 36'; Jang Song-hyok 87' (pen.)	Stadium: Dasarath Rangasala Stadium; Attendance: 9,000; Referee: Ryuji Sato (Japan)

10 September 2012 Friendly	Indonesia	0–2	North Korea	Jakarta, Indonesia
				Stadium: Gelora Bung Karno Stadium

1 December 2012 2013 EAFF East Asian Cup qualification	Chinese Taipei	1–6	North Korea	Mong Kok, Hong Kong
	Chen Hao-wei 79'		An Il-bom 28'; Pak Song-chol 34'; Ri Kwang-hyok 42'; Pak Nam-chol 65'; Ri Myong-jun 67', 89'	Stadium: Mong Kok Stadium; Attendance: 3,040

3 December 2012 2013 EAFF East Asian Cup qualification	North Korea	5–0	Guam	Mong Kok, Hong Kong
	An Il-bom 25'; Ri Myong-jun 34', 59'; Pak Nam-chol 82'; Jong Il-gwan 87'			Stadium: Mong Kok Stadium; Attendance: 4,160

5 December 2012 2013 EAFF East Asian Cup qualification	North Korea	1–1	Australia	Causeway Bay, Hong Kong
	An Yong-hak 64'		Thompson 4'	Stadium: Hong Kong Stadium; Attendance: 989

9 December 2012 2013 EAFF East Asian Cup qualification	Hong Kong	0–4	North Korea	Causeway Bay, Hong Kong
			Pak Nam-chol 27'; Ryang Yong-gi 33'; Pak Nam-chol 36'; Pak Song-chol 85'	Stadium: Hong Kong Stadium; Attendance: 3,345

=== 2013 ===
23 January 2013 2013 King's Cup	North Korea	1–1 (1–4 p)	Sweden	Chiang Mai, Thailand
	Hong Kum-song 48'		Fejzullahu 56'	Stadium: 700th Anniversary Stadium; Attendance: 500
	Penalties
	Jang Kuk-chol (penalty missed); Kang Kuk-chol (penalty missed); Kim Chol-bom (penalty scored)		(penalty scored) Svensson; (penalty scored) Majstorović; (penalty scored) Hysén; (penalty scored) P. Jansson

26 January 2013 2013 King's Cup	Thailand	2–2	North Korea	Chiang Mai, Thailand
	Teeratep 26' (pen.); Datsakorn 61'		Jo Kwang 58'; Pak Hyon-il 70'	Stadium: 700th Anniversary Stadium

31 January 2013 Friendly	North Korea	1–0	United Arab Emirates	Shenzhen, China
				Stadium: Shenzhen Stadium

6 February 2013 Friendly	North Korea	1–0	Laos	Kunming, China
				Stadium: Kunming Tuodong Sports Center

11 June 2013 Friendly	Qatar	0–0	North Korea	Doha, Qatar

6 September 2013 Friendly	Kuwait	2–1	North Korea	Ardiya, Kuwait

=== 2014 ===
21 February 2014 Friendly	Iraq	2–1	North Korea	Dubai, United Arab Emirates

31 October 2014 Friendly	Kuwait	1–0	North Korea	Al Awir, United Arab Emirates

2 November 2014 Friendly	Bahrain	2–2	North Korea	Riffa, Bahrain

6 November 2014 Friendly	Qatar	3–1	North Korea	Doha, Qatar

13 November 2014 2015 EAFF East Asian Cup qualification	North Korea	2–1	Hong Kong	Taipei, Taiwan
	Ri Chol-myong 59'; O Hyok-chol 80'		McKee 83'	Stadium: Taipei Municipal Stadium; Attendance: 800

16 November 2014 2015 EAFF East Asian Cup qualification	Guam	1–5	North Korea	Taipei, Taiwan
	Cunliffe 61'		Jong Il-gwan 14', 72'; Ri Sang-chol 85', 89'; Kye Song-hyok 90'	Stadium: Taipei Municipal Stadium; Attendance: 657

19 November 2014 2015 EAFF East Asian Cup qualification	Chinese Taipei	0–0	North Korea	Taipei, Taiwan
				Stadium: Taipei Municipal Stadium; Attendance: 5,807

=== 2015 ===
10 January 2015 2015 AFC Asian Cup	Uzbekistan	1–0	North Korea	Sydney, Australia
	Sergeev 62'			Stadium: Stadium Australia; Attendance: 12,078; Referee: Nawaf Shukralla (Bahrain)

14 January 2015 2015 AFC Asian Cup	North Korea	1–4	Saudi Arabia	Melbourne, Australia
	Ryang Yong-gi 12'		Hazazi 37'; Al-Sahlawi 52', 54'; Al Abed 76'	Stadium: Melbourne Rectangular Stadium; Attendance: 12,349; Referee: Abdullah Al Hilali (Oman)

18 January 2015 2015 AFC Asian Cup	China	2–1	North Korea	Canberra, Australia
	Sun Ke 1', 42'		Gao Lin 57' (o.g.)	Stadium: Canberra Stadium; Attendance: 18,457; Referee: Abdulrahman Abdou (Qatar)

17 May 2015 Friendly	Vietnam	1–1	North Korea	Hanoi, Vietnam

20 May 2015 Friendly	Thailand	0–1	North Korea	Bangkok, Thailand

11 June 2015 2018 FIFA World Cup qualification	Yemen	0–3; Awarded (Note: FIFA awarded North Korea a 3–0 win as a result of Yemen fielding the ineligible player Mudir Al-Radaei, after North Korea had defeated Yemen by 1–0. Al-Radaei failed to serve an automatic one match suspension for receiving two yellow cards earlier in the First round of the competition.)	North Korea	Doha, Qatar (Note: Yemen played their home matches in Qatar because of security concerns from the Saudi Arabian-led intervention in Yemen.)
			So Hyon-uk 71'	Stadium: Suheim Bin Hamad Stadium; Attendance: 3,200

16 June 2015 2018 FIFA World Cup qualification	North Korea	4–2	Uzbekistan	Pyongyang, North Korea
	Pak Kwang-ryong 4'; Jang Kuk-chol 16'; Ro Hak-su 34'; Ri Hyok-chol 36'		Ismailov 53'; Rashidov 79'	Stadium: Kim Il-sung Stadium; Attendance: 42,000

2 August 2015 2015 EAFF East Asian Cup	North Korea	2–1	Japan	Wuhan, China
	Ri Hyok-chol 78'; Pak Hyon-il 88'	Report	Muto 3'	Stadium: Wuhan Sports Center Stadium; Referee: Alireza Faghani (Iran)

5 August 2015 2015 EAFF East Asian Cup	China	2–0	North Korea	Wuhan, China
	Yu Dabao 36'; Wang Yongpo 51' (pen.)	Report		Stadium: Wuhan Sports Center Stadium; Referee: Mohd Amirul Izwan (Malaysia)

9 August 2015 2015 EAFF East Asian Cup	South Korea	0–0	North Korea	Wuhan, China
		Report		Stadium: Wuhan Sports Center Stadium; Referee: Alireza Faghani (Iran)

3 September 2015 2018 FIFA World Cup qualification	Bahrain	0–1	North Korea	Riffa, Bahrain
			Jong Il-gwan 42'	Stadium: Bahrain National Stadium; Attendance: 9,500

8 October 2015 2018 FIFA World Cup qualification	North Korea	0–0	Philippines	Pyongyang, North Korea
				Stadium: Kim Il-sung Stadium; Attendance: 41,000

13 October 2015 2018 FIFA World Cup qualification	North Korea	1–0	Yemen	Pyongyang, North Korea
	Jong Il-gwan 12' (pen.)			Stadium: Kim Il-sung Stadium; Attendance: 42,000

12 November 2015 2018 FIFA World Cup qualification	Uzbekistan	3–1	North Korea	Tashkent, Uzbekistan
	Sergeev 23'; Geynrikh 65'; Ahmedov 87'		Ri Hyok-chol 2'	Stadium: Pakhtakor Markaziy Stadium; Attendance: 27,135

17 November 2015 2018 FIFA World Cup qualification	North Korea	2–0	Bahrain	Pyongyang, North Korea
	Pak Kwang-ryong 45+1' (pen.); Jong Il-gwan 90+3'			Stadium: Kim Il-sung Stadium; Attendance: 45,000

=== 2016 ===
29 March 2016 2018 FIFA World Cup qualification	Philippines	3–2	North Korea	Manila, Philippines
	Bahadoran 43'; Ott 84'; Ramsay 90'		So Kyong-jin 45+2'; Ri Hyok-chol 48'	Stadium: Rizal Memorial Stadium; Attendance: 7,350

16 August 2016 Friendly	North Korea	1–0	Iraq	Shah Alam, Malaysia
				Stadium: Shah Alam Stadium

21 August 2016 Friendly	Iraq	1–1	North Korea	Seremban, Malaysia
				Stadium: Tuanku Abdul Rahman Stadium

24 August 2016 Friendly	North Korea	2–0	United Arab Emirates	Shanghai, China
				Stadium: Hongkou Football Stadium

6 October 2016 Friendly	Vietnam	5–2	North Korea	Ho Chi Minh City, Vietnam
				Stadium: Thống Nhất Stadium

10 October 2016 Friendly	Philippines	1–3	North Korea	Bocaue, Philippines
				Stadium: Philippine Sports Stadium

6 November 2016 2017 EAFF E-1 Championship qualification	North Korea	2–0	Chinese Taipei	Mong Kok, Hong Kong
	Jong Il-gwan 16'; Sim Hyon-jin 87'			Stadium: Mong Kok Stadium

9 November 2016 2017 EAFF E-1 Championship qualification	Guam	0–2	North Korea	Mong Kok, Hong Kong
			So Hyon-uk 66'; Pak Kwang-ryong 87'	Stadium: Mong Kok Stadium

12 November 2016 2017 EAFF E-1 Championship qualification	Hong Kong	0–1	North Korea	Mong Kok, Hong Kong
			Jong Il-gwan 22'	Stadium: Mong Kok Stadium; Attendance: 4,838

=== 2017 ===
6 June 2017 Friendly	Qatar	2–2	North Korea	Doha, Qatar

13 June 2017 2019 AFC Asian Cup qualification	Hong Kong	1–1	North Korea	Causeway Bay, Hong Kong
	Tan Chun Lok 45+1'		Kim Yu-song 46'	Stadium: Hong Kong Stadium; Attendance: 8,194

14 July 2017 2017 King's Cup	Thailand	3–0	North Korea	Bangkok, Thailand
	Mongkol 40'; Thitipan 77'; Teeratep 90+1' (pen.)			Stadium: Rajamangala Stadium

16 July 2017 2017 King's Cup	Burkina Faso	3–3 (4–3 p)	North Korea	Bangkok, Thailand
	Zagré 44'; L. Traoré 68', 73'		Pak Song-chol 4'; Myong Cha-hyon 66' (pen.); Rim Kwang-hyok 82'	Stadium: Rajamangala Stadium; Referee: Zaw Khaing (Myanmar)
	Penalties
	L. Traoré (penalty scored); Ouattara (penalty scored); Béao (penalty scored); Tapsoba (penalty missed); Sawadogo (penalty scored)		(penalty missed) Rim Kwang-hyok; (penalty missed) Jo Kwang; (penalty scored) Kim Ju-song; (penalty scored) Song Kum-il; (penalty scored) Pak Song-chol

5 September 2017 2019 AFC Asian Cup qualification	North Korea	2–2	Lebanon	Pyongyang, North Korea
	Kim Yu-song 23'; Ri Yong-jik 87'		Mansour 47'; Maatouk 90+4'	Stadium: Kim Il-sung Stadium; Attendance: 31,000

10 October 2017 2019 AFC Asian Cup qualification	Lebanon	5–0	North Korea	Beirut, Lebanon
	El-Helwe 21'; Maatouk 25'; Ayass 50'; Hamam 80'; Ataya 90+1'			Stadium: Camille Chamoun Sports City Stadium; Attendance: 3,000; Referee: Minoru Tōjō (Japan)

10 November 2017 2019 AFC Asian Cup qualification	North Korea	4–1	Malaysia	Buriram, Thailand (Note: Due to the death of Kim Jong-nam that led to a diplomatic crisis between Malaysia and North Korea, the Malaysian government decided to disallow the Malaysian football team from playing in North Korea for safety reasons. On 10 March 2017, the Asian Football Confederation (AFC) announced that North Korea's home match against Malaysia, originally scheduled for 28 March at the Kim Il-sung Stadium in Pyongyang, would be postponed, with the AFC announcing on 15 March 2017 that the match would be played on 8 June. On 17 May 2017, the AFC announced that the match was postponed for a second time, to 5 October, due to "geo-political tension on the Korean Peninsula". On 28 September 2017, the AFC announced that the match was again postponed after the Malaysian government announced a travel ban on Malaysian nationals visiting North Korea. On 20 October 2017, the AFC announced that both matches between North Korea and Malaysia would be played at a neutral venue in the interests of competition fairness, with North Korea's "home" match played on 10 November 2017 and Malaysia's "home" match played on 13 November 2017.)
				Stadium: Buriram Stadium; Attendance: 287

13 November 2017 2019 AFC Asian Cup qualification	Malaysia	1–4	North Korea	Buriram, Thailand (Note: On 15 March 2017, the AFC announced that should diplomatic relations between the two countries not return to normal, the match between North Korea and Malaysia would be played at a neutral venue, and Malaysia's home match against North Korea would also be moved to a neutral venue to preserve sporting values and the spirit of fair play. After the AFC received confirmation that Malaysians were allowed to travel to North Korea, the AFC agreed that the match would be played in Pyongyang. However, at the announcement of the second postponement, the AFC said the venue would be decided after monitoring the safety and security of the AFC Cup and AFC U-23 Championship qualifying matches taking place in North Korea in the coming months. On 20 October 2017, the AFC announced that both matches between North Korea and Malaysia would be played at a neutral venue in the interests of competition fairness, with North Korea's "home" match played on 10 November 2017 and Malaysia's "home" match played on 13 November 2017, which were later confirmed to be played at Thailand.)
				Stadium: Buriram Stadium; Attendance: 504

9 December 2017 2017 EAFF E-1 Championship	Japan	1–0	North Korea	Chōfu, Japan
	Ideguchi 90+3'			Stadium: Ajinomoto Stadium; Attendance: 20,806; Referee: Chris Beath (Australia)

12 December 2017 2017 EAFF E-1 Championship	North Korea	0–1	South Korea	Chōfu, Japan
			Ri Yong-chol 64' (o.g.)	Stadium: Ajinomoto Stadium; Attendance: 5,477; Referee: Hettikamkanamge Perera (Sri Lanka)

16 December 2017 2017 EAFF E-1 Championship	China	1–1	North Korea	Chōfu, Japan
	Wei Shihao 28'		Jong Il-gwan 81'	Stadium: Ajinomoto Stadium; Attendance: 18,272; Referee: Valentin Kovalenko (Uzbekistan)

=== 2018 ===
27 March 2018 2019 AFC Asian Cup qualification	North Korea	2–0	Hong Kong	Pyongyang, North Korea
	Jong Il-gwan 19'; Pak Kwang-ryong 25'			Stadium: Kim Il-sung Stadium; Attendance: 32,000

13 October 2018 Friendly	Uzbekistan	2–0	North Korea	Tashkent, Uzbekistan
				Stadium: Milliy Stadium

11 November 2018 2019 EAFF E-1 Championship qualification	North Korea	4–1	Mongolia	Taipei, Taiwan
	Rim Kwang-hyok 8', 54'; Kim Yu-song 29'; Jong Il-gwan 64'		Nyam-Osoryn 74'	Stadium: Taipei Municipal Stadium; Attendance: 125

13 November 2018 2019 EAFF E-1 Championship qualification	Hong Kong	0–0	North Korea	Taipei, Taiwan
				Stadium: Taipei Municipal Stadium; Attendance: 228

16 November 2018 2019 EAFF E-1 Championship qualification	Chinese Taipei	0–2	North Korea	Taipei, Taiwan
			Jong Il-gwan 48'; Jang Kuk-chol 73'	Stadium: Taipei Municipal Stadium; Attendance: 2,016

25 December 2018 Friendly	Vietnam	1–1	North Korea	Hanoi, Vietnam
				Stadium: Mỹ Đình National Stadium

29 December 2018 Friendly	Bahrain	4–0	North Korea	Isa Town, Bahrain
				Stadium: Khalifa Sports City Stadium

=== 2019 ===
8 January 2019 2019 AFC Asian Cup	Saudi Arabia	4–0	North Korea	Dubai, United Arab Emirates
	Bahebri 28'; Al-Fatil 37'; Al-Dawsari 70'; Al-Muwallad 87'			Stadium: Rashid Stadium; Attendance: 5,075; Referee: Peter Green (Australia)

13 January 2019 2019 AFC Asian Cup	North Korea	0–6	Qatar	Al Ain, United Arab Emirates
			Ali 9', 11', 55', 60'; Khoukhi 43'; A. Hassan 68'	Stadium: Khalifa bin Zayed Stadium; Attendance: 452; Referee: Hettikamkanamge Perera (Sri Lanka)

17 January 2019 2019 AFC Asian Cup	Lebanon	4–1	North Korea	Sharjah, United Arab Emirates
	F. Michel Melki 27'; El-Helwe 65', 90+8'; Maatouk 80' (pen.)		Pak Kwang-ryong 9'	Stadium: Sharjah Stadium; Attendance: 4,332; Referee: Chris Beath (Australia)

7 June 2019 Friendly	Uzbekistan	4–0	North Korea	Tashkent, Uzbekistan
				Stadium: Milliy Stadium

8 July 2019 2019 Intercontinental Cup	Syria	5–2	North Korea	Ahmedabad, India
20:00	Al Hamwi 41', 61'; Marmour 56', 65'; Al-Khatib 90'	Report	Jong Il-gwan 3'; Ri Hyong-jin 78'	Stadium: TransStadia; Referee: Venkatesh Ramachandran (India)

13 July 2019 2019 Intercontinental Cup	India	2–5	North Korea	Ahmedabad, India
20:00	Chhangte 51'; Chhetri 71'	Report	Jong Il-gwan 8', 28'; Sim Hyon-jin 16'; Ri Un-chol 63'; Ri Hyong-jin 90+2'	Stadium: TransStadia; Attendance: 9,590; Referee: Akhrol Riskullaev (Uzbekistan)

15 July 2019 2019 Intercontinental Cup	North Korea	1–0	Tajikistan	Ahmedabad, India
20:00	Ri Hyong-jin 33'	Report		Stadium: TransStadia; Attendance: 634; Referee: Venkatesh Ramachandran (India)

19 July 2019 2019 Intercontinental Cup final	Tajikistan	0–1	North Korea	Ahmedabad, India
20:00		Report	Pak Hyon-il 71'	Stadium: TransStadia; Attendance: 1,832; Referee: Akhrol Riskullaev (Uzbekistan)

5 September 2019 2022 FIFA World Cup qualification	North Korea	2–0	Lebanon	Pyongyang, North Korea
	Jong Il-gwan 7', 56'			Stadium: Kim Il-sung Stadium; Attendance: 40,000; Referee: Sherzod Kasimov (Uzbekistan)

10 September 2019 2022 FIFA World Cup qualification	Sri Lanka	0–1	North Korea	Colombo, Sri Lanka
			Jang Kuk-chol 67'	Stadium: Colombo Racecourse; Attendance: 1,258; Referee: Timur Faizullin (Kyrgyzstan)

15 October 2019 2022 FIFA World Cup qualification	North Korea	0–0	South Korea	Pyongyang, North Korea
				Stadium: Kim Il-sung Stadium; Attendance: 100; Referee: Abdulrahman Al-Jassim (Qatar)

14 November 2019 2022 FIFA World Cup qualification	Turkmenistan	3–1	North Korea	Ashgabat, Turkmenistan
	Titow 23'; Amanow 73'; Orazsähedow 88'		Han Kwang-song 90+3'	Stadium: Köpetdag Stadium; Attendance: 26,500; Referee: Sivakorn Pu-udom (Thailand)

19 November 2019 2022 FIFA World Cup qualification	Lebanon	0–0	North Korea	Beirut, Lebanon
				Stadium: Camille Chamoun Sports City Stadium; Attendance: 0 (Note: The Lebanon match against North Korea was played behind closed doors due to security concerns arising from the Lebanese protests.); Referee: Yaqoob Abdul Baki (Oman)

== Head-to-head records ==
North Korea national football team head-to-head records (2010–2019)
Opponent	Pld	W	D	L	GF	GA	GD	Pts	Confederation
Afghanistan	1	1	0	0	2	0	+2	3	AFC
Australia	1	0	1	0	1	1	0	1	AFC
Bahrain	5	3	1	1	6	6	0	10	AFC
Burkina Faso	1	0	1	0	3	3	0	1	CAF
Brazil	1	0	0	1	1	2	–1	0	CONMEBOL
China	4	0	1	3	2	7	–5	1	AFC
Chinese Taipei	4	3	1	0	10	1	+9	10	AFC
Ivory Coast	1	0	0	1	0	3	–3	0	CAF
Greece	1	0	1	0	2	2	0	1	UEFA
Guam	3	3	0	0	12	1	+11	9	AFC
Hong Kong	6	4	2	0	10	2	+8	14	AFC
India	3	3	0	0	12	2	+10	9	AFC
Indonesia	1	1	0	0	2	0	+2	3	AFC
Iran	2	0	0	2	0	2	–2	0	AFC
Iraq	5	1	1	3	3	5	–2	4	AFC
Japan	4	2	0	2	3	3	0	6	AFC
Jordan	1	0	1	0	1	1	0	1	AFC
Kuwait	6	0	3	3	5	8	–3	3	AFC
Kyrgyzstan	1	1	0	0	4	0	+4	3	AFC
Laos	1	1	0	0	1	0	+1	3	AFC
Lebanon	5	1	2	2	5	11	–6	5	AFC
Malaysia	2	2	0	0	8	2	+6	6	AFC
Mexico	1	0	0	1	1	2	–1	0	CONCACAF
Mongolia	1	1	0	0	4	1	+3	3	AFC
Myanmar	1	1	0	0	5	0	+5	3	AFC
Nepal	1	1	0	0	1	0	+1	3	AFC
Nigeria	1	0	0	1	1	3	–2	0	CAF
Palestine	1	1	0	0	2	0	+2	3	AFC
Paraguay	1	0	0	1	0	1	–1	0	CONMEBOL
Philippines	4	2	1	1	7	4	+3	7	AFC
Portugal	1	0	0	1	0	7	–7	0	UEFA
Qatar	4	1	1	2	4	11	–7	4	AFC
Saudi Arabia	2	0	0	2	1	8	–7	0	AFC
Singapore	1	1	0	0	2	1	+1	3	AFC
South Africa	1	0	1	0	0	0	0	1	CAF
South Korea	3	0	2	1	0	1	–1	2	AFC
Sri Lanka	2	2	0	0	5	0	+5	6	AFC
Sweden	1	0	1	0	1	1	0	1	UEFA
Syria	1	0	0	1	2	5	–3	0	AFC
Tajikistan	5	4	1	0	6	1	+5	13	AFC
Thailand	3	1	1	1	3	5	–2	4	AFC
Turkmenistan	4	1	2	1	5	6	–1	5	AFC
United Arab Emirates	3	2	1	0	3	0	+3	7	AFC
Uzbekistan	7	1	0	6	5	14	–9	3	AFC
Venezuela	2	0	1	1	2	3	–1	1	CONMEBOL
Vietnam	5	1	3	1	6	7	–1	6	AFC
Yemen	3	2	1	0	5	1	+4	7	AFC
Total	109	48	31	30	154	144	+10	175	
