= 2010 AFC Challenge Cup squads =

Below are the squads for the 2010 AFC Challenge Cup in Sri Lanka, that took place between 16 February and 27 February 2010. The players' listed age is their age on the tournament's opening day (16 February 2010).

== Group A ==
=== Tajikistan ===
Coach: Pulod Kodirov

No.	Pos.	Player	Date of birth (age)	Caps	Club
1	GK	Alisher Tuychiev	3 March 1976 (aged 33)	8	(Uzbekistan) Metalourg Bekabad
3	DF	Naim Nosirov	28 April 1986 (aged 23)	19	(Tajikistan) Regar-TadAZ
4	DF	Davron Ergashev	19 March 1988 (aged 21)	7	(Tajikistan) Regar-TadAZ
7	MF	Ibrahim Rabimov	3 August 1987 (aged 22)	16	(Tajikistan) Regar-TadAZ
9	MF	Khurshed Mahmudov (c)	8 August 1982 (aged 27)	15	(Tajikistan) Regar-TadAZ
10	FW	Davronjon Tukhtasunov	14 May 1990 (aged 19)	7	(Tajikistan) Regar-TadAZ
11	FW	Numonjon Hakimov	5 September 1978 (aged 31)	27	(Tajikistan) Vakhsh
12	DF	Eraj Rajabov	9 November 1990 (aged 19)	10	(Tajikistan) Esteghlal Dushanbe
13	DF	Asatullo Nurulloev	21 June 1984 (aged 25)	2	(Tajikistan) Vakhsh
14	DF	Ruslan Tavakalov	unknown	2	(Tajikistan) Parvoz Bobojon
15	DF	Sohib Savankulov	15 September 1988 (aged 21)	11	(Tajikistan) Vakhsh
17	MF	Dilshod Vasiev	12 February 1988 (aged 22)	6	(Tajikistan) Esteghlal Dushanbe
18	MF	Fatkhullo Fatkhuloev	24 March 1990 (aged 19)	11	(Tajikistan) Esteghlal Dushanbe
19	FW	Dzhomikhon Mukhidinov	15 April 1976 (aged 33)	27	(Tajikistan) Vakhsh
22	FW	Yusuf Rabiev	24 December 1979 (aged 30)	26	(Tajikistan) Esteghlal Dushanbe
23	DF	Farrukh Choriev	24 July 1984 (aged 25)	7	(Tajikistan) Regar-TadAZ
25	FW	Kamil Saidov	25 January 1989 (aged 21)	12	(Tajikistan) Regar-TadAZ
27	DF	Isomiddin Qurbonov	12 September 1990 (aged 19)	0	(Tajikistan) Dynamo Dushanbe
29	MF	Alisher Ulmasov	18 December 1986 (aged 23)	1	(Tajikistan) Regar-TadAZ
30	GK	Alisher Dodov	4 August 1981 (aged 28)	5	(Tajikistan) Regar-TadAZ

=== Bangladesh ===
Coach: Saiful Bari Titu

No.	Pos.	Player	Date of birth (age)	Caps	Club
1	GK	Aminul Haque (c)	16 September 1980 (aged 29)	44	(Bangladesh) Mohammedan Dhaka
2	DF	Nasirul Islam Nasir	5 October 1988 (aged 21)	5	(Bangladesh) Mohammedan Dhaka
3	DF	Waly Faisal	1 March 1985 (aged 24)	20	(Bangladesh) Abahani Dhaka
4	DF	Mintu Sheikh	3 December 1989 (aged 20)	0	(Bangladesh) Feni Soccer
5	DF	Razaul Karim	1 July 1987 (aged 22)	0	(Bangladesh) Farashganj
6	DF	Atiqur Rahman Meshu	26 August 1988 (aged 21)	7	(Bangladesh) Brothers Union
8	MF	Mamunul Islam	12 December 1988 (aged 21)	5	(Bangladesh) Abahani Dhaka
9	FW	Enamul Haque	1 November 1985 (aged 24)	6	(Bangladesh) Abahani Dhaka
10	FW	Zahid Hasan Ameli	25 December 1987 (aged 22)	26	(Bangladesh) Mohammedan Dhaka
11	MF	Shakil Ahmed	7 January 1988 (aged 22)	0	(Bangladesh) Mohammedan Dhaka
14	DF	Mohd Mamun Miah	11 September 1987 (aged 22)	5	(Bangladesh) Rahmatganj
15	MF	Imtiaz Sultan Jitu	10 February 1990 (aged 20)	0	(Bangladesh) Farashganj
17	MF	Mobarak Hossain Bhuyan	12 December 1990 (aged 19)	0	(Bangladesh) Sheikh Russel
18	FW	Abdul Baten Komol	2 August 1987 (aged 22)	1	(Bangladesh) Mohammedan Dhaka
19	MF	Mohammed Zahid Hossain	15 June 1988 (aged 21)	14	(Bangladesh) Brothers Union
20	FW	Mithun Chowdhury	10 February 1989 (aged 21)	1	(Bangladesh) Abahani Chittagong
21	MF	Tawhidul Alam Sabuz	14 September 1990 (aged 19)	0	(Bangladesh) Farashganj
35	MF	Alamgir Kabir Rana	7 June 1990 (aged 19)	0	(Bangladesh) Mohammedan Dhaka
39	DF	Nasiruddin Chowdhury	9 October 1979 (aged 30)	0	(Bangladesh) Mohammedan Dhaka
41	GK	Biplob Bhattacharjee	7 January 1981 (aged 29)	10	(Bangladesh) Abahani Dhaka
45	FW	Rokonuzzaman Kanchan	22 June 1982 (aged 27)	29	(Bangladesh) Muktijoddha

=== Myanmar ===
Coach: Tin Myint Aung

No.	Pos.	Player	Date of birth (age)	Caps	Club
2	DF	Han Win Aung	17 December 1986 (aged 23)	2	(Myanmar) Kanbawza
3	DF	Win Min Htut	6 April 1986 (aged 23)	3	(Myanmar) Kanbawza
4	DF	Moe Win	30 March 1988 (aged 21)	3	(Myanmar) Kanbawza
5	DF	Khin Maung Lwin	14 July 1980 (aged 29)	3	(Myanmar) Kanbawza
7	MF	Zaw Htet Aung	11 May 1987 (aged 22)	3	(Myanmar) Yadanabon
8	DF	Khin Maung Tun	18 September 1985 (aged 24)	0	(Myanmar) Yadanabon
10	MF	Tun Tun Win	15 December 1987 (aged 22)	1	(Myanmar) Yadanabon
11	FW	Pyaye Phyo Oo	16 July 1990 (aged 19)	3	(Myanmar) Delta United
12	FW	Aung Kyaw Myo	5 May 1990 (aged 19)	3	(Myanmar) Delta United
14	MF	Myo Min Tun (c)	14 July 1986 (aged 23)	3	(Myanmar) Yangon United
15	DF	Aye San	24 December 1988 (aged 21)	1	(Myanmar) Kanbawza
17	DF	Shwe Hlaing Win	15 December 1988 (aged 21)	0	(Myanmar) Yangon United
18	GK	Thiha Si Thu	10 February 1987 (aged 23)	0	(Myanmar) Delta United
19	GK	Aung Aung Oo	8 June 1982 (aged 27)	0	(Myanmar) Yangon United
20	MF	Pai Soe	22 January 1987 (aged 23)	2	(Myanmar) Yadanabon
21	FW	Yan Paing	27 November 1983 (aged 26)	0	(Myanmar) Yadanabon
24	MF	Yan Aung Kyaw	4 August 1986 (aged 23)	0	(Myanmar) Yangon United
25	DF	Zaw Lynn Tun	23 July 1983 (aged 26)	0	(Myanmar) Zeyashwemye
28	FW	Kyaw Ko Ko	20 December 1992 (aged 17)	0	(Myanmar) Zeyashwemye
30	FW	Kyaw Thi Ha	24 August 1986 (aged 23)	0	(Myanmar) Kanbawza
34	DF	Htay Aung	15 August 1985 (aged 24)	0	(Myanmar) Yangon United
36	FW	Soe Min Oo	8 March 1988 (aged 21)	0	(Myanmar) Kanbawza
37	DF	Yan Aung Win	9 September 1992 (aged 17)	0	(Myanmar) Yangon United

=== Sri Lanka ===
Coach: Mohamed Amanulla

No.	Pos.	Player	Date of birth (age)	Caps	Club
1	GK	Viraj Asanka	17 May 1987 (aged 22)		(Sri Lanka) Saunders
2	DF	Bandara Warakagoda	13 October 1986 (aged 23)		(Sri Lanka) Renown SC
4	DF	Rohana Ruwan Thilaka (captain)	21 September 1984 (aged 25)		(Sri Lanka) Saunders
5	DF	Mohamed Imtiyas	12 February 1989 (aged 21)		(Sri Lanka) Renown SC
6	FW	Mohamed Izzadeen	8 June 1979 (aged 30)		(Sri Lanka) Army SC
8	MF	Fazlur Rahman	15 May 1977 (aged 32)		(Sri Lanka) Ratnam SC
9	FW	Sanjeev Shanmugarajah	9 March 1988 (aged 21)		(Sri Lanka) Air Force SC
10	DF	Chathura Gunarathna	8 September 1982 (aged 27)		(Sri Lanka) Don Bosco SC
12	MF	Tuwan Rizni	16 June 1990 (aged 19)		(Sri Lanka) Renown SC
14	FW	Malik Migara	25 October 1989 (aged 20)		(Sri Lanka) Ratnam SC
15	DF	Chathuranga Kumara	11 October 1986 (aged 23)		(Sri Lanka) Air Force SC
17	FW	Philip Dalpethado	unknown		(Sri Lanka) Don Bosco SC
18	DF	Madushka Peiris	5 October 1987 (aged 22)		(Sri Lanka) Negombo Youth
19	DF	Thuwan Raheem	11 September 1979 (aged 30)		(Sri Lanka) Air Force SC
20	GK	Sampath Buddika	9 March 1989 (aged 20)		(Sri Lanka) unknown
21	GK	Mohamed Hajmal	20 August 1987 (aged 22)		(Sri Lanka) unknown
23	FW	Shafraz Kaiz	23 June 1989 (aged 20)		(Sri Lanka) Renown SC
24	FW	Nadeeka Pushpakumara	11 March 1986 (aged 23)		(Sri Lanka) Ratnam SC
29	DF	Nirantha Perera	29 February 1984 (aged 25)		(Sri Lanka) Army SC
38	FW	Chathura Samarasekara	22 December 1985 (aged 24)		(Sri Lanka) Saunders

== Group B ==
=== India ===
Coach: Sukhvinder Singh

- The AIFF sent the India U-23 team for this tournament, therefore no caps at any level are displayed.

No.	Pos.	Player	Date of birth (age)	Caps	Club
3	DF	Nirmal Chettri	21 December 1990 (aged 19)	—	(India) East Bengal
4	DF	Rowilson Rodrigues	26 March 1987 (aged 22)	—	(India) Churchill Brothers
5	DF	Ravinder Singh	4 September 1991 (aged 18)	—	Air India
8	DF	Naoba Singh	1 March 1988 (aged 21)	—	(India) Churchill Brothers
9	MF	Balwant Singh	16 December 1986 (aged 23)	—	(India) JCT
10	FW	Sushil Kumar Singh (c)	25 June 1984 (aged 25)	—	(India) Mahindra United
11	MF	Joaquim Abranches	28 October 1985 (aged 24)	—	(India) Dempo
12	FW	Jeje Lalpekhlua	7 January 1991 (aged 19)	—	(India) Pune
13	MF	Khangebam Jibon Singh	6 February 1990 (aged 20)	—	(India) East Bengal
14	DF	Dharmaraj Ravanan	27 July 1987 (aged 22)	—	(India) Mahindra United
16	FW	Jagtar Singh	18 May 1991 (aged 18)	—	(India) Tata FA
17	DF	Robert Lalthalma	4 September 1988 (aged 21)	—	(India) Churchill Brothers
18	DF	Denzil Franco	30 June 1986 (aged 23)	—	(India) Mahindra United
19	MF	Lalrindika Ralte	7 September 1992 (aged 17)	—	(India) Churchill Brothers
21	GK	Laxmikant Kattimani	3 May 1989 (aged 20)	—	(India) Dempo
22	GK	Gurpreet Singh Sandhu	3 February 1992 (aged 18)	—	(India) East Bengal
23	MF	Jewel Raja Shaikh	19 January 1990 (aged 20)	—	(India) Dempo
24	FW	Singam Subhash Singh	2 February 1990 (aged 20)	—	(India) East Bengal
29	GK	Karanjit Singh	8 January 1986 (aged 24)	—	(India) JCT
30	MF	Baljit Sahni	12 January 1987 (aged 23)	—	(India) JCT
31	MF	Gurwinder Singh	16 April 1986 (aged 23)	—	(India) JCT
33	DF	Debabrata Roy	4 December 1986 (aged 23)	—	(India) Mahindra United

=== Kyrgyzstan ===
Coach: Anarbek Ormonbekov

No.	Pos.	Player	Date of birth (age)	Caps	Club
1	GK	Pavel Matiash	11 July 1987 (aged 22)	4	(Kyrgyzstan) Dordoi-Dynamo
2	DF	Sergey Chikishev	29 July 1984 (aged 25)	4	(Kyrgyzstan) Sher-Ak-Dan
3	DF	Vladimir Kasian	5 March 1988 (aged 21)	3	(Kyrgyzstan) Abdish-Ata
4	DF	Azamat Baimatov	3 December 1988 (aged 21)	0	(Kyrgyzstan) Dordoi-Dynamo
5	DF	Rustam Zakirov	19 December 1989 (aged 20)	6	(Kyrgyzstan) Abdish-Ata
6	DF	Faruh Abitov	4 December 1988 (aged 21)	5	(Kyrgyzstan) Dordoi-Dynamo
7	FW	Anton Zemlianuhin	11 December 1988 (aged 21)	9	(Kyrgyzstan) Abdish-Ata
8	FW	Almazbek Mirzaliev	10 June 1987 (aged 22)	10	(Kyrgyzstan) Abdish-Ata
9	MF	Sergey Kaleutin	20 June 1986 (aged 23)	4	(Kyrgyzstan) Abdish-Ata
11	FW	Ildar Amirov	9 October 1987 (aged 22)	15	(Kyrgyzstan) Dordoi-Dynamo
13	DF	Davron Askarov	6 January 1988 (aged 22)	18	(France) Toulouse
14	MF	Vadim Harchenko	28 May 1984 (aged 25)	31	(Kyrgyzstan) Dordoi-Dynamo
15	MF	Aibek Bokoev (c)	19 June 1978 (aged 31)	19	(Kyrgyzstan) Dordoi-Dynamo
17	DF	Kursanbek Sheratov	1 October 1989 (aged 20)	2	(Kyrgyzstan) Kant-77
20	MF	Islam Shamshiev	1 March 1991 (aged 18)	0	(Kyrgyzstan) Dordoi-Dynamo
22	MF	Pavel Sidorenko	26 March 1987 (aged 22)	7	(Kyrgyzstan) Abdish-Ata
24	FW	Kayumzhan Sharipov	27 June 1991 (aged 18)	5	(Kyrgyzstan) Abdish-Ata
25	MF	Artem Muladjanov	4 February 1988 (aged 22)	2	(Kyrgyzstan) Dordoi-Dynamo
28	DF	Rustem Usanov	12 September 1985 (aged 24)	6	(Kyrgyzstan) Abdish-Ata
30	GK	Vladislav Volkov	15 August 1980 (aged 29)	7	(Kyrgyzstan) Dordoi-Dynamo

=== North Korea ===
Coach: Jo Tong-Sop

No.	Pos.	Player	Date of birth (age)	Caps	Club
1	GK	Ri Kang	20 April 1988 (aged 21)	0	(North Korea) Rimyongsu
2	DF	Ryang Myong-Il	31 July 1987 (aged 22)	4	(North Korea) Wolmido
3	DF	Kim Myong-Gyu	8 January 1985 (aged 25)	2	(North Korea) Rimyongsu
5	FW	Kim Seong-Yong	26 February 1987 (aged 22)	0	(Japan) Kyoto Sanga
9	MF	Pak Song-Chol (c)	24 September 1987 (aged 22)	10	(North Korea) Rimyongsu
10	FW	Choe Chol-Man	22 September 1985 (aged 24)	15	(North Korea) April 25
11	FW	Pak Chol-Min	10 December 1988 (aged 21)	7	(North Korea) Rimyongsu
12	MF	Sin Yong-Nam	23 January 1978 (aged 32)	11	(North Korea) Amrokgang
13	FW	Pak Kwang-Ryong	27 September 1992 (aged 17)	2	(North Korea) Wolmido
14	DF	Pak Yong-Jin	29 January 1989 (aged 21)	2	(North Korea) Rimyongsu
16	DF	Jon Kwang-Ik	5 April 1988 (aged 21)	8	(North Korea) Amrokgang
17	MF	Yun Yong-Il	31 July 1988 (aged 21)	9	(North Korea) Wolmido
18	DF	Kim Song-Gi	23 October 1988 (aged 21)	0	Korea University of Japan
19	FW	Chae Tu-Yong	7 June 1990 (aged 19)	5	(North Korea) April 25
20	GK	Ju Kwang-Min	20 May 1990 (aged 19)	9	(North Korea) Kigwancha
22	MF	Kim Won-Sik	5 November 1991 (aged 18)	0	(North Korea) Pyongyang City
23	DF	Pak Nam-Chol	3 October 1988 (aged 21)	33	(North Korea) Amrokgang
24	MF	Ri Chol-Myong	18 February 1988 (aged 21)	8	(North Korea) Pyongyang City
25	MF	Choe Myong-Ho	3 July 1988 (aged 21)	3	(North Korea) Pyongyang City
28	DF	Ri Kwang-Hyok	17 August 1987 (aged 22)	11	(North Korea) Kyonggongop
29	MF	Ryang Yong-Gi	7 January 1982 (aged 28)	6	(Japan) Vegalta Sendai

=== Turkmenistan ===
Coach: Ýazguly Hojageldiýew

No.	Pos.	Player	Date of birth (age)	Caps	Club
2	DF	Guwanç Rejepow	20 April 1982 (aged 27)	12	Unattached
4	DF	Begli Annageldiýew	24 May 1984 (aged 25)	18	(Turkmenistan) HTTU
5	DF	Maksim Belyh	7 August 1984 (aged 25)	5	(Uzbekistan) Pakhtakor
6	MF	Nazar Çöliýew	21 July 1986 (aged 23)	6	(Turkmenistan) Aşgabat
7	FW	Berdi Şamyradow	22 June 1982 (aged 27)	9	(Turkmenistan) HTTU
9	DF	Azat Garajaýew	23 April 1984 (aged 25)	0	(Turkmenistan) HTTU
10	MF	Mihail Muhammedow	5 July 1987 (aged 22)	0	(Turkmenistan) HTTU
12	FW	Didargylyç Urazow	27 February 1977 (aged 32)	11	(Turkmenistan) HTTU
13	FW	Guwançmuhammet Öwekow	2 February 1981 (aged 29)	20	(Uzbekistan) Navbahor Namangan
15	DF	Omar Berdiýew	25 June 1979 (aged 30)	34	(Azerbaijan) Karvan
16	GK	Baýramnyýaz Berdiýew (c)	13 September 1974 (aged 35)	22	(Uzbekistan) Navbahor Namangan
17	DF	Begli Nurmyradow	27 May 1981 (aged 28)	2	(Turkmenistan) HTTU
20	MF	Nazar Baýramow	4 September 1982 (aged 27)	26	(Azerbaijan) Neftchi Baku
23	DF	Baýramdurdy Meredow	27 March 1979 (aged 30)	8	(Turkmenistan) HTTU
25	MF	Döwlet Baýramow	8 August 1982 (aged 27)	2	(Turkmenistan) HTTU
26	MF	Döwran Allanazarow	23 February 1986 (aged 23)	0	(Turkmenistan) HTTU
29	DF	Dawid Sarkisow	20 November 1982 (aged 27)	0	(Turkmenistan) HTTU
31	FW	Mämmedaly Garadanow	17 March 1982 (aged 27)	13	(Turkmenistan) HTTU
32	MF	Ruslan Mingazow	23 November 1991 (aged 18)	2	(Latvia) Skonto
34	FW	Arslanmyrat Amanow	28 March 1990 (aged 19)	2	(Turkmenistan) Aşgabat
36	GK	Rahmanberdi Alyhanow	19 January 1986 (aged 24)	1	(Turkmenistan) HTTU
40	MF	Mekan Datdow	2 January 1983 (aged 27)	1	(Turkmenistan) HTTU
