= 2012 AFC Challenge Cup final =

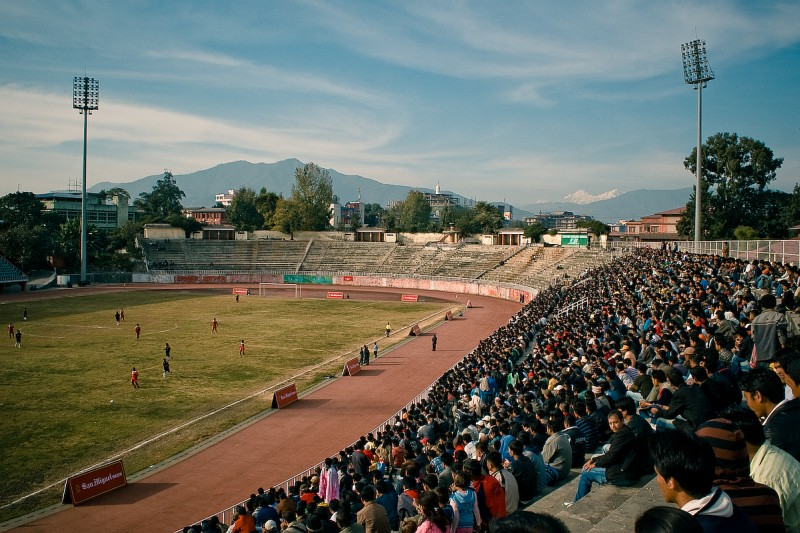
- The Dasarath Rangasala Stadium, where the match was held.
- Event: 2012 AFC Challenge Cup
Turkmenistan	North Korea
(Turkmenistan)	(North Korea)
1	2
- Date: 19 March 2012
- Venue: Dasarath Rangasala Stadium, Kathmandu
- Referee: Ryuji Sato (Japan)
- Attendance: 9,000
- Weather: Sunny; 73 °F (23 °C)

The 2012 AFC Challenge Cup final was an association football match between Turkmenistan and North Korea on 19 March 2012 at the Dasarath Rangasala Stadium in Kathmandu, Nepal.

== Background ==
The AFC Challenge Cup was an international football competition for Asian Football Confederation (AFC) nations that was categorized as "emerging countries" in the "Vision Asia" program. It was an idea by former AFC president Mohammed Bin Hammam and its goal was to raise the standards of Asian football at all levels. The AFC Challenge Cup, which reflected the philosophy of "Vision Asia", was created for teams to experience playing in a continental competition with the possibility to win an AFC trophy and potentially discover new talent. It was held in every two years as its inaugural edition took place on 2006 in Bangladesh. The winner qualifies for the 2015 AFC Asian Cup.

== Route to the final ==
Turkmenistan		Round	North Korea	
AFC Challenge Cup
Opponent	Result	Qualifying round	Opponent	Result
Pakistan	3–0	Qualifying Matchday 1	Sri Lanka	0–4
Chinese Taipei	2–0	Qualifying Matchday 2	Nepal	1–0
India	1–1	Qualifying Matchday 3	Afghanistan	2–0
Group B second place: Team / Pld / W / D / L / GF / GA / GD / Pts; India / 3 / 2 / 1 / 0 / 7 / 2 / +5 / 7; Turkmenistan / 3 / 2 / 1 / 0 / 6 / 1 / +5 / 7; Pakistan / 3 / 1 / 0 / 2 / 3 / 6 / −3 / 3; Chinese Taipei / 3 / 0 / 0 / 3 / 0 / 7 / −7 / 0; Source: RSSSF		Qualifying round standings	Group D first place: Team / Pld / W / D / L / GF / GA / GD / Pts; North Korea / 3 / 3 / 0 / 0 / 7 / 0 / +7 / 9; Nepal / 3 / 1 / 1 / 1 / 1 / 1 / 0 / 4; Afghanistan / 3 / 1 / 0 / 2 / 1 / 3 / −2 / 3; Sri Lanka / 3 / 0 / 1 / 2 / 0 / 5 / −5 / 1; Source: RSSSF	
Opponent	Result	Group stage	Opponent	Result
Maldives	3–1	Matchday 1	Philippines	2–0
Palestine	0–0	Matchday 2	Tajikistan	2–0
Nepal	3–0	Matchday 3	India	4–0
Group A first place: Team / Pld / W / D / L / GF / GA / GD / Pts; Turkmenistan / 3 / 2 / 1 / 0 / 6 / 1 / +5 / 7; Palestine / 3 / 2 / 1 / 0 / 4 / 0 / +4 / 7; Maldives / 3 / 1 / 0 / 2 / 2 / 5 / −3 / 3; Nepal (H) / 3 / 0 / 0 / 3 / 0 / 6 / −6 / 0; Source: RSSSF (H) Hosts		Final standings	Group B first place: Team / Pld / W / D / L / GF / GA / GD / Pts; North Korea / 3 / 3 / 0 / 0 / 8 / 0 / +8 / 9; Philippines / 3 / 2 / 0 / 1 / 4 / 3 / +1 / 6; Tajikistan / 3 / 1 / 0 / 2 / 3 / 4 / −1 / 3; India / 3 / 0 / 0 / 3 / 0 / 8 / −8 / 0; Source: RSSSF	
Opponent	Result	Knockout stage	Opponent	Result
Philippines	2–1	Semi-finals	Palestine	2–0

== Match ==
19 March 2012
18:30

Turkmenistan	1–2	North Korea
Şamyradow 2'	Report	Jong Il-gwan 36'; Jang Song-hyok 87' (pen.)

Dasarath Rangasala Stadium, Kathmandu
Attendance: 9,000
Referee: Ryuji Sato (Japan)

Turkmenistan	North Korea

GK	1	Rahmanberdi Alyhanow
DF	12	Serdar Annaorazow	(yellow card) 11'	(substituted off) 64'
DF	18	Şöhrat Söýünow	(yellow card) 90+4'
DF	23	Dawid Sarkisow	(yellow card) 86'
DF	34	Akmyrat Jumanazarow
MF	8	Bahtiýar Hojaahmedow
MF	19	Ahmet Ataýew	(yellow card) 58'
MF	26	Elman Tagaýew		(substituted off) 42'
MF	30	Umidjan Astanow
FW	7	Berdi Şamyradow (c)
FW	22	Guwanç Abylow		(substituted off) 54'
Substitutions:
MF	6	Ruslan Mingazow		(substituted on) 42'
FW	17	Arslanmyrat Amanow		(substituted on) 54'
DF	14	Guwanç Rejepow		(substituted on) 64'
Manager:
Ýazguly Hojageldyýew

GK	1	Ri Myong-guk
DF	5	Ri Kwang-chon (c)
DF	12	Jon Kwang-ik	(yellow card) 90+3'
DF	14	Pak Nam-chol II
DF	19	Jang Kuk-chol		(substituted off) 53'
DF	20	Ri Kwang-hyok
MF	4	Pak Nam-chol I
MF	8	Ri Chol-myong
MF	17	An Yong-hak		(substituted off) 73'
FW	10	Pak Kwang-ryong		(substituted off) 90+2'
FW	11	Jong Il-gwan	(yellow card) 62'
Substitutions:
FW	25	Kim Ju-song		(substituted on) 53'
DF	23	Jang Song-hyok		(substituted on) 73'
MF	22	Pak Song-chol I		(substituted on) 90+2'
Manager:
Yun Jong-su

Man of the Match:

Assistant referees:
Azman Ismail (Malaysia)
Humoud Al-Sahli (Kuwait)
Fourth official:
Yousef Al-Marzouqi (Kuwait)
