= 2010 AFC Challenge Cup final =

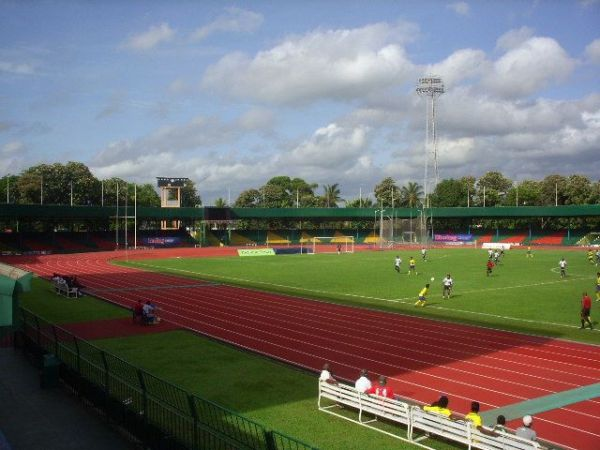
- The Sugathadasa Stadium where it was held.
- Event: 2010 AFC Challenge Cup
Turkmenistan	North Korea
(Turkmenistan)	(North Korea)
1	1
- North Korea won 5–4 on penalties
- Date: 27 February 2010
- Venue: Sugathadasa Stadium, Colombo
- Referee: Alireza Faghani (Iran)
- Attendance: 3,000

The 2010 AFC Challenge Cup final was an association football match between Turkmenistan and North Korea on 27 February 2010 at Sugathadasa Stadium in Colombo, Sri Lanka.

== Background ==
The AFC Challenge Cup was an international football competition for Asian Football Confederation (AFC) nations that was categorized as "emerging countries" in the "Vision Asia" program. It was an idea by former AFC president, Mohammed bin Hammam which its goal to raise the standards of Asian football at all levels. The AFC Challenge Cup, which reflected the philosophy of "Vision Asia", was created for teams to experience playing in a continental competition with the possibility to win an AFC trophy and potentially discover new talent. It was held in every two years as its inaugural edition took place on 2006 in Bangladesh. The winner qualifies for the 2011 AFC Asian Cup.

== Route to the final ==
Turkmenistan		Round	North Korea	
AFC Challenge Cup
Opponent	Result	Qualifying round	Opponent	Result
Maldives	3–1	Qualifying Matchday 1	Automatic qualifier	
Bhutan	7–0	Qualifying Matchday 2	Automatic qualifier	
Philippines	5–0	Qualifying Matchday 3	Automatic qualifier	
Group B first place: Team / Pld / W / D / L / GF / GA / GD / Pts; Turkmenistan / 3 / 3 / 0 / 0 / 15 / 1 / +14 / 9; Maldives / 3 / 2 / 0 / 1 / 9 / 5 / +4 / 6; Philippines / 3 / 1 / 0 / 2 / 3 / 8 / −5 / 3; Bhutan / 3 / 0 / 0 / 3 / 0 / 13 / −13 / 0; Source:		Qualifying round standings	Automatic qualifier	
Opponent	Result	Group stage	Opponent	Result
North Korea	1–1	Matchday 1	Turkmenistan	1–1
India	1–0	Matchday 2	Kyrgyzstan	4–0
Kyrgyzstan	1–0	Matchday 3	North Korea	3–0
Group A first place: Team / Pld / W / D / L / GF / GA / GD / Pts; North Korea / 3 / 2 / 1 / 0 / 8 / 1 / +7 / 7; Turkmenistan / 3 / 2 / 1 / 0 / 3 / 1 / +2 / 7; Kyrgyzstan / 3 / 1 / 0 / 2 / 2 / 6 / −4 / 3; India U23 / 3 / 0 / 0 / 3 / 1 / 6 / −5 / 0; Source: RSSSF		Final standings	Group B first place: Team / Pld / W / D / L / GF / GA / GD / Pts; North Korea / 3 / 2 / 1 / 0 / 8 / 1 / +7 / 7; Turkmenistan / 3 / 2 / 1 / 0 / 3 / 1 / +2 / 7; Kyrgyzstan / 3 / 1 / 0 / 2 / 2 / 6 / −4 / 3; India U23 / 3 / 0 / 0 / 3 / 1 / 6 / −5 / 0; Source: RSSSF	
Opponent	Result	Knockout stage	Opponent	Result
Tajikistan	2–0	Semi-finals	Myanmar	5–0

== Match ==
27 February 2010
19:00

Turkmenistan	1–1	North Korea
Şamyradow 33'	Report	Ryang Yong-gi 75'
Penalties
Öwekow (penalty scored); Garadanow (penalty missed); Şamyradow (penalty scored); Rejepow (penalty scored); Nurmyradow (penalty scored); Amanow (penalty missed)	4–5	(penalty scored) Pak Song-chol; (penalty scored) Ryang Yong-gi; (penalty scored) Chae Tu-yong; (penalty scored) Pak Yong-jin; (penalty missed) Ri Chol-myong; (penalty scored) Ri Kwang-hyok

Sugathadasa Stadium, Colombo
Attendance: 3,000
Referee: Alireza Faghani (Iran)
