= Dawid Sarkisow =

Turkmenistan footballer

Personal information
- Date of birth: November 20, 1982 (age 43)
- Place of birth: Aşgabat, Turkmen SSR, USSR
- Position: Defender

Team information
- Current team: Aşgabat FK
- Number: 23

Senior career*
Years	Team	Apps	(Gls)
2004	Nisa Aşgabat		
2006-2014	HTTU Aşgabat		
2015	Aşgabat FK		
2016	Şagadam FK		
2017	Energetik FK		
2018–	Aşgabat FK		

International career^{‡}
2004–2013	Turkmenistan	16	(0)
- * Club domestic league appearances and goals as of 15 March 2020 ‡ National team caps and goals as of 15 March 2020

Dawid Sarkisow (born 20 November 1982) is a Turkmen footballer currently playing for Aşgabat FK. He has also been capped by the national team 16 times. Sarkisow is an ethnic Armenian.

== Club career ==
From summer 2015 player of FC Ashgabat.

== International career ==
Sarkisow has played for Turkmenistan 16 times, playing in the 2012 AFC Challenge Cup and FIFA World Cup qualifying matches.

== Honors ==
AFC Challenge Cup:

- Runners-up: 2012
