= Asatullo Nurulloev =

Tajikistani footballer

Personal information
- Full name: Asatullo Nurulloev
- Date of birth: 21 June 1984 (age 42)
- Place of birth: Tajikistan
- Height: 1.83 m (6 ft 0 in)
- Position: Midfielder

Team information
- Current team: Parvoz Bobojon Ghafurov

Senior career*
Years	Team	Apps	(Gls)
2009	Parvoz Bobojon Ghafurov		
2010	Vakhsh Qurghonteppa		
2011	Parvoz Bobojon Ghafurov		
2011	Khujand		
2012–	Parvoz Bobojon Ghafurov		

International career^{‡}
2009–	Tajikistan	11	(0)
- * Club domestic league appearances and goals as of 25 November 2015 ‡ National team caps and goals as of 25 November 2015

Asatullo Nurulloev (born 21 June 1984) is a Tajikistani footballer who currently plays for Parvoz Bobojon Ghafurov, and the Tajikistan national football team.

He played for Tajikistan during the 2010 AFC Challenge Cup.

== Career statistics ==
=== International ===
Tajikistan national team
Year	Apps	Goals
2009	1	0
2010	5	0
2011	5	0
Total	11	0

Statistics accurate as of match played 23 July 2013
