= Tun Tun Win =

Burmese footballer

Personal information
- Full name: Tun Tun Win
- Date of birth: December 15, 1987 (age 38)
- Place of birth: Bago, Myanmar
- Position: Midfielder

International career
Years	Team	Apps	(Gls)
2004–	Myanmar	24	(2)

Tun Tun Win (Burmese: ထွန်းထွန်းဝင်း;born 15 December 1987) is a footballer from Myanmar. He made his first appearance for the Myanmar national football team in 2004.

== International goals ==
No.	Date	Venue	Opponent	Score	Result	Competition
1.	18 February 2010	Sugathadasa Stadium, Colombo, Sri Lanka	Bangladesh	1–0	2–0	2010 AFC Challenge Cup
