= AFC Challenge Cup =

- Organiser(s): AFC
- Founded: 2006; 20 years ago
- Abolished: 2014; 12 years ago
- Region: Asia
- Teams: 8 (final stage)
- Related competitions: AFC Solidarity Cup
- Last champions: Palestine (1st title)
- Most championships: North Korea (2 titles)

The AFC Challenge Cup was an international football competition for Asian Football Confederation (AFC) member countries that were categorised as "emerging countries" in the "Vision Asia" programme. It was created by former AFC president Mohammed bin Hammam as the AFC's plan for a continent-wide programme to raise the standards of Asian football. The AFC Challenge Cup was created for teams to experience playing in a continental competition, with the possibility to win an AFC trophy and potentially discover new talents.

The inaugural tournament was hosted by Bangladesh in 2006 and was held biennially. An amendment to men's national team competitions in July 2006, meant that starting with the 2008 and 2010 editions of the AFC Challenge Cup, the winners automatically qualify for the AFC Asian Cup.

In the 2011 and 2015 AFC Asian Cup tournaments, two qualification spots have been allocated to the two most recent AFC Challenge Cup winners. The 2014 tournament was the last edition of this competition, due to the expansion of the Asian Cup to the 24-nation format from the 16-nations one after the 2015 edition. In April 2016, several associations requested a new competition as they were having problems arranging friendly matches, and the AFC created the Solidarity Cup.

== Selection of teams ==
The AFC initially divided their 46 member nations into three groups in 2006. Although the tournament was meant for the countries of emerging associations class, some countries from the developing associations class have participated in the qualification and the finals of the tournament such as India, Maldives, Myanmar, North Korea, Tajikistan and Turkmenistan. As a result, only one team from the emerging class ever won the tournament, Palestine in 2014. In late March 2012, the Northern Mariana Islands Football Association, although only an associate member of the AFC, was approved to enter their national team in the competition. In November 2012, the AFC announced North Korea's exclusion from future AFC Challenge Cups.

The top 15 are classed as developed associations:

- Australia
- Bahrain
- China
- Malaysia
- Iran
- Iraq
- Japan
- Kuwait
- Qatar
- Saudi Arabia
- South Korea
- Thailand
- United Arab Emirates
- Uzbekistan
- Vietnam

The next 14 are classed as developing associations:

- India
- Bangladesh
- Hong Kong
- Jordan
- Lebanon
- Indonesia
- Maldives
- Myanmar
- North Korea
- Oman
- Singapore
- Syria
- Turkmenistan
- Yemen

Eligible in the AFC Challenge Cup Former participants

The last 17 are classed as emerging associations, which need time to develop their football. They are eligible in the AFC Challenge Cup. These are the teams which participate:

- Afghanistan
- Bhutan
- Brunei
- Cambodia
- Chinese Taipei
- Guam
- Kyrgyzstan
- Laos
- Macau
- Mongolia
- Nepal
- Pakistan
- Palestine
- Philippines
- Sri Lanka
- Tajikistan
- Timor-Leste

== Results ==
Year	Host	Final			Losing semi-finalists			Number of teams
Year	Host	Winner	Score	Runner-up	Losing semi-finalists			Number of teams
2006; Details	Bangladesh	Tajikistan	4–0	Sri Lanka	Kyrgyzstan and Nepal			16
Year	Host	Final			Third place match			Number of teams
Year	Host	Winner	Score	Runner-up	Third place	Score	Fourth place	Number of teams
2008; Details	India	India	4–1	Tajikistan	North Korea	4–0	Myanmar	8
2010; Details	Sri Lanka	North Korea	1–1 (a.e.t.) (5–4 pens.)	Turkmenistan	Tajikistan	1–0	Myanmar	8
2012; Details	Nepal	North Korea	2–1	Turkmenistan	Philippines	4–3	Palestine	8
2014; Details	Maldives	Palestine	1–0	Philippines	Maldives	1–1 (a.e.t.) (8–7 pens.)	Afghanistan	8

== Most successful teams ==
Team	Champion	Runners-up	Third place	Fourth place
North Korea	2 (2010, 2012)		1 (2008)	
Tajikistan	1 (2006)	1 (2008)	1 (2010)	
Palestine	1 (2014)			1 (2012)
India	1 (2008)			
Turkmenistan		2 (2010, 2012)		
Philippines		1 (2014)	1 (2012)	
Sri Lanka		1 (2006)		
Kyrgyzstan			1 (2006^)	
Nepal			1 (2006^)	
Maldives			1 (2014)	
Myanmar				2 (2008, 2010)
Afghanistan				1 (2014)

== Participating nations ==
The participating countries of the AFC Challenge Cup and their number of appearances in the tournament. 4 appearances 3 appearances 2 appearances 1 appearance Never qualified Ineligible Not an associate member of AFC

Legend

- 1st — Champion
- 2nd — Runner-up
- 3rd — Third place
- 4th — Fourth place
- SF — Semifinals

- QF — Quarterfinals
- GS — Group stage
- Q — Qualified for the upcoming tournament
- × — Did not enter; withdrew; banned
- ‡ — Tournament was unavailable for the nation that year

For each tournament, the number of teams in each of the finals tournament are shown.

Teams	2006 (16)	2008 (8)	2010 (8)	2012 (8)	2014 (8)	Years
Afghanistan	GS	GS	×	•	4th	3
Bangladesh	QF	•	GS	•	•	2
Bhutan	GS	•	•	•	•	1
Brunei	GS	•	•	×	×	1
Cambodia	GS	•	•	•	•	1
Chinese Taipei	QF	•	•	•	•	1
Guam	GS	•	•	•	•	1
India	•	1st	•	GS	•	2
India U20	QF	•	•	•	•	1
India U23	•	•	GS	•	•	1
Kyrgyzstan	SF	•	GS	•	GS	3
Laos	•	×	•	•	GS	1
Macau	GS	•	•	•	•	1
Maldives	‡	‡	•	GS	3rd	2
Mongolia	•	×	•	•	•	0
Myanmar	‡	4th	4th	•	GS	3
Nepal	SF	GS	•	GS	•	3
North Korea	‡	3rd	1st	1st	‡	3
Northern Mariana Islands	‡	‡	‡	‡	•	0
Pakistan	GS	•	•	•	•	1
Palestine	QF	×	•	4th	1st	3
Philippines	GS	•	•	3rd	2nd	3
Sri Lanka	2nd	GS	GS	•	•	3
Tajikistan	1st	2nd	3rd	GS	•	4
Timor-Leste	×	×	×	×	×	0
Turkmenistan	‡	GS	2nd	2nd	GS	4

== Champions by region ==
Federations (Region)	Champions	Titles	Years
EAFF (East Asia)	North Korea	2	2010, 2012
WAFF (West Asia)	Palestine	1	2014
CAFA (Central Asia)	Tajikistan	1	2006
SAFF (South Asia)	India	1	2008
AFF (South East Asia)			

== Summary ==
=== AFC Challenge Cup (2006–2014) ===
Rank	Team	Part	M	W	D	L	GF	GA	GD	Points
1	North Korea	3	15	12	2	1	35	4	+31	38
2	Tajikistan	4	19	11	2	6	36	16	+20	35
3	Turkmenistan	4	16	8	4	4	27	14	+13	28
4	Palestine	3	14	8	3	3	29	8	+21	27
5	Philippines	3	13	6	3	4	18	14	+4	21
6	India	4	15	5	3	7	13	21	–8	18
7	Kyrgyzstan	3	11	5	0	6	7	12	–5	15
8	Myanmar	3	13	5	0	8	15	22	–7	15
9	Sri Lanka	3	12	4	2	6	12	22	–10	14
10	Nepal	3	11	3	2	6	11	14	–3	11
11	Bangladesh	2	7	3	1	3	10	13	–3	10
12	Maldives	2	8	2	2	4	9	12	–3	8
13	Afghanistan	3	11	1	5	5	7	19	–12	8
14	Chinese Taipei	1	4	1	2	1	3	5	–2	5
15	Brunei	1	3	1	1	1	2	2	0	4
16	Pakistan	1	3	1	1	1	3	4	–1	4
17	Cambodia	1	3	1	0	2	4	6	–2	3
18	Bhutan	1	3	0	1	2	0	3	–3	1
19	Macau	1	3	0	1	2	2	8	–6	1
20	Laos	1	3	0	1	2	1	7	–6	1
21	Guam	1	3	0	0	3	0	17	–17	0

=== AFC Challenge Cup (Qualification) (2008– 2014) ===
Rank	Team	Part	M	W	D	L	GF	GA	GD	Points
1	Philippines	4	13	7	3	3	23	11	+12	24
2	Afghanistan	3	10	6	2	2	10	4	+6	20
3	Turkmenistan	3	8	6	1	1	28	3	+25	19
4	Tajikistan	3	9	6	1	2	15	2	+13	19
5	Sri Lanka	4	12	5	3	4	28	18	+10	18
6	Myanmar	3	9	5	2	2	16	8	+8	17
7	Pakistan	4	12	5	2	5	26	21	+5	17
8	Kyrgyzstan	4	10	5	2	3	12	10	+2	17
9	Palestine	3	8	4	4	0	16	2	+14	16
10	Nepal	4	10	4	4	2	12	6	+6	16
11	Bangladesh	4	11	5	1	5	14	10	+4	16
12	Maldives	2	6	4	1	1	15	6	+9	13
13	India	2	6	4	1	1	13	4	+7	13
14	Chinese Taipei	4	14	3	4	7	22	24	–2	13
15	North Korea	1	3	3	0	0	7	0	+7	9
16	Cambodia	4	12	3	0	9	13	35	–22	9
17	Mongolia	3	7	2	1	4	6	11	–5	7
18	Laos	2	5	1	3	1	9	10	–1	6
19	Macau	4	12	2	0	10	11	29	–18	6
20	Guam	2	6	1	0	5	7	27	–20	3
21	Brunei	2	6	0	1	5	2	22	–20	1
22	Bhutan	3	8	0	1	7	1	24	–23	1
23	Northern Mariana Islands	1	3	0	0	3	0	19	–19	0

== Awards ==
=== Most valuable player ===
Year	Player
2006	(Tajikistan) Ibrahim Rabimov
2008	(India) Bhaichung Bhutia
2010	(North Korea) Ryang Yong-gi
2012	(North Korea) Pak Nam-chol
2014	(Palestine) Murad Ismail

=== Top scorer ===
Year	Player	Goals
2006	(Palestine) Fahed Attal	8
2008	(North Korea) Pak Song-chol	6
2010	(North Korea) Ryang Yong-gi	4
2012	(Philippines) Phil Younghusband	6
2014	(Palestine) Ashraf Nu'man	4

=== Winning coach ===
Year	Country	Coach
2006	Tajikistan	(Tajikistan) Sharif Nazarov
2008	India	(England) Bob Houghton
2010	North Korea	(North Korea) Jo Tong-sop
2012	North Korea	(North Korea) Yun Jong-su
2014	Palestine	(Jordan) Jamal Mahmoud
