= 2012 AFC Challenge Cup =

एएफसी च्यालेन्ज कप फुटबल-२०१२
- Logo of the 2012 AFC Challenge Cup

Tournament details
- Host country: Nepal
- Dates: 8–19 March
- Teams: 8
- Venues: 2 (in 1 host city)

Final positions
- Champions: North Korea (2nd title)
- Runners-up: Turkmenistan
- Third place: Philippines
- Fourth place: Palestine

Tournament statistics
- Matches played: 16
- Goals scored: 42 (2.63 per match)
- Attendance: 50,000 (3,125 per match)
- Top scorer(s): (Philippines) Phil Younghusband (6 goals)
- Best player: (North Korea) Pak Nam-chol

The 2012 AFC Challenge Cup was the fourth edition of the tournament, an international football competition for Asian Football Confederation (AFC) member nations that are mainly categorized as "emerging countries" in the defunct Vision Asia programme. It took place in Nepal from 8–19 March 2012. Unlike in previous editions of the tournament, there were no automatic qualifiers. Therefore, 2010 champions North Korea, runners-up Turkmenistan, and third-placed Tajikistan had to navigate the qualification phase in order to return to the finals. North Korea successfully defended their title and qualified for the 2015 AFC Asian Cup.

== Hosts ==
Maldives, Nepal and Palestine expressed an interest to bid to host the tournament. A decision on which country would be hosts was set to be made by the Asian Football Confederation (AFC) on 14 June 2011, but was deferred until the AFC Executive Committee on 29 July 2011. The committee decided to endorse Nepal as the hosts of the AFC Challenge Cup 2012 Finals.

== Venues ==
Kathmandu
Dasarath Rangasala Stadium	Halchowk Stadium
Capacity: 17,800	Capacity: 3,500
2012 AFC Challenge Cup is located in Nepal

== Qualification ==
The qualification stage saw 20 eligible member associations compete in qualifiers.

- An initial pre-qualifying round (home and away) narrowed the field to 16 teams.
- The final qualifying round consist of four groups of four teams each with the group winners and runners-up qualifying.
- Only the eight teams that qualified for the tournament finals were permitted to bid to be hosts.

=== Qualified nations ===
- Palestine – Qualification Group A winners
- Philippines – Qualification Group A runners-up
- India – Qualification Group B winners
- Turkmenistan – Qualification Group B runners-up
- Maldives – Qualification Group C winners
- Tajikistan – Qualification Group C runners-up
- North Korea – Qualification Group D winners
- Nepal – Qualification Group D runners-up

== Draw ==
The draw for the final tournament was held on 1 December 2011 at the Soaltee Crown Plaza Hotel in Kathmandu, Nepal.

== Squads ==
Each team could name a squad of 23 players.

== Group stage ==
All times are Nepal Time (NPT) – UTC+5:45

Key to colours in group tables
Top two placed teams advance to the semi-finals

=== Tie-breaking criteria ===
The teams are ranked according to points (3 points for a win, 1 point for a tie, 0 points for a loss) and tie breakers are in following order:

1. Greater number of points obtained in the group matches between the teams concerned;
2. Goal difference resulting from the group matches between the teams concerned;
3. Greater number of goals scored in the group matches between the teams concerned;
4. Goal difference in all the group matches;
5. Greater number of goals scored in all the group matches;
6. Kicks from the penalty mark if only two teams are involved and they are both on the field of play;
7. Fewer score calculated according to the number of yellow and red cards received in the group matches; (1 point for each yellow card, 3 points for each red card as a consequence of two yellow cards, 3 points for each direct red card, 4 points for each yellow card followed by a direct red card)
8. Drawing of lots.

=== Group A ===
Team	Pld	W	D	L	GF	GA	GD	Pts
Turkmenistan	3	2	1	0	6	1	+5	7
Palestine	3	2	1	0	4	0	+4	7
Maldives	3	1	0	2	2	5	−3	3
Nepal (H)	3	0	0	3	0	6	−6	0

Source: RSSSF
(H) Hosts
8 March 2012
15:00

Turkmenistan	3–1	Maldives
Mingazow 33'; Çoňkaýew 78'; Amanow 85'	Report	Adhuham 20'

Halchowk Stadium, Kathmandu
Attendance: 1,000
Referee: Yousef Al-Marzouq (Kuwait)
8 March 2012
17:00

Nepal	0–2	Palestine
	Report	Attieh 4'; Attal 65'

Dasarath Rangasala Stadium, Kathmandu
Attendance: 12,300
Referee: Ryuji Sato (Japan)

10 March 2012
15:00

Palestine	0–0	Turkmenistan
	Report

Halchowk Stadium, Kathmandu
Attendance: 1,000
Referee: Ko Hyung-Jin (Korea Republic)
10 March 2012
17:00

Maldives	1–0	Nepal
Rasheed 51'	Report

Dasarath Rangasala Stadium, Kathmandu
Attendance: 15,000
Referee: Dmitriy Mashentsev (Kyrygyzstan)

12 March 2012
15:00

Nepal	0–3	Turkmenistan
	Report	Tagaýew 7'; Biraj 79' (o.g.); Hangeldiýew 89'

Dasarath Rangasala Stadium, Kathmandu
Attendance: 2,400
Referee: Ali Sabbagh (Lebanon)
12 March 2012
15:00

Maldives	0–2	Palestine
	Report	Wadi 59'; Nu'man 90+4'

Halchowk Stadium, Kathmandu
Attendance: 300
Referee: Dmitriy Mashentsev (Kyrygyzstan)

=== Group B ===
Team	Pld	W	D	L	GF	GA	GD	Pts
North Korea	3	3	0	0	8	0	+8	9
Philippines	3	2	0	1	4	3	+1	6
Tajikistan	3	1	0	2	3	4	−1	3
India	3	0	0	3	0	8	−8	0

Source: RSSSF
9 March 2012
15:00

North Korea	2–0	Philippines
Pak Nam-chol I 58'; Jang Kuk-chol 70'	Report

Halchowk Stadium, Kathmandu
Attendance: 1,500
Referee: Pratap Singh (India)
9 March 2012
17:00

India	0–2	Tajikistan
	Report	Khamroqulov 61'; Davronov 66'

Dasarath Rangasala Stadium, Kathmandu
Attendance: 700
Referee: Ali Sabbagh (Lebanon)

11 March 2012
15:00

Tajikistan	0–2	North Korea
	Report	Pak Nam-chol I 4'; Jang Kuk-chol 86'

Halchowk Stadium, Kathmandu
Attendance: 1,000
Referee: Yousef Al-Marzouq (Kuwait)
11 March 2012
17:00

Philippines	2–0	India
P. Younghusband 10', 73'	Report

Dasarath Rangasala Stadium, Kathmandu
Attendance: 300
Referee: Chaiya Mahapab (Thailand)

13 March 2012
15:00

North Korea	4–0	India
Jon Kwang-ik 3'; Ri Kwang-hyok 34'; Pak Nam-chol I 59'; Ri Chol-myong 70'	Report

Dasarath Rangasala Stadium, Kathmandu
Attendance: 200
Referee: Chaiya Mahapab (Thailand)
13 March 2012
15:00

Tajikistan	1–2	Philippines
Negmatov 45+1'	Report	P. Younghusband 54'; Á. Guirado 80'

Halchowk Stadium, Kathmandu
Attendance: 800
Referee: Ryuji Sato (Japan)

== Knockout stage ==
Semi-finals
16 March
Turkmenistan	2
Philippines	1
16 March
North Korea	2
Palestine	0

Final
19 March
Turkmenistan	1
North Korea	2
Third place
19 March
Philippines	4
Palestine	3

=== Semi-finals ===
16 March 2012
14:30

Turkmenistan	2–1	Philippines
Amanow 80'; Çoňkaýew 86'	Report	P. Younghusband 25'

Dasarath Rangasala Stadium, Kathmandu
Attendance: 500
Referee: Ko Hyung-jin (Korea Republic)

16 March 2012
18:30

North Korea	2–0	Palestine
Pak Kwang-ryong 42', 68'	Report

Dasarath Rangasala Stadium, Kathmandu
Attendance: 3,000
Referee: Yousef Al-Marzouq (Kuwait)

=== Third place play-off ===
19 March 2012
14:30

Philippines	4–3	Palestine
P. Younghusband 4', 25' (pen.); Á. Guirado 42'; J. Guirado 69'	Report	Abuhabib 21', 67'; Attal 78'

Dasarath Rangasala Stadium, Kathmandu
Attendance: 1,000
Referee: Ali Sabbagh (Lebanon)

=== Final ===
19 March 2012
18:30

Turkmenistan	1–2	North Korea
Şamyradow 2'	Report	Jong Il-gwan 36'; Jang Song-hyok 87' (pen.)

Dasarath Rangasala Stadium, Kathmandu
Attendance: 9,000
Referee: Ryuji Sato (Japan)

== Statistics ==
=== Winner ===
2012 AFC Challenge Cup champions

North Korea
Second title

=== Individual awards ===
The following awards were given for the 2012 AFC Challenge Cup:

Fair Play Award	Golden Shoe	Most Valuable Player
North Korea	(Philippines) Phil Younghusband	(North Korea) Pak Nam-chol I

=== Team of the tournament ===
The team of the tournament – Dream Team in a 4-4-2 formation.

- Goalkeeper: (North Korea) Ri Myong-guk
- Defenders: (North Korea) Ri Kwang-hyok, (Turkmenistan) Şöhrat Söýünow, (Palestine) Khaled Mahdi, (North Korea) Jon Kwang-ik
- Midfielders: (Turkmenistan) Arslanmyrat Amanow, (Turkmenistan) Guwanç Rejepow, (North Korea) Pak Nam-chol I, (North Korea) Jong Il-gwan
- Forwards: (North Korea) Pak Kwang-ryong, (Philippines) Phil Younghusband
- Coach: Yun Jong-su (North Korea)

=== Goalscorers ===
6 goals

- (Philippines) Phil Younghusband

3 goals

- (North Korea) Pak Nam-chol I

2 goals

- (North Korea) Jang Kuk-chol
- (North Korea) Pak Kwang-ryong
- (Palestine) Abdelhamid Abuhabib
- (Palestine) Fahed Attal
- (Philippines) Ángel Guirado
- (Turkmenistan) Arslanmyrat Amanow
- (Turkmenistan) Gahrymanberdi Çoňkaýew

1 goal

- (North Korea) Jang Song-hyok
- (North Korea) Jon Kwang-ik
- (North Korea) Jong Il-gwan
- (North Korea) Ri Chol-myong
- (North Korea) Ri Kwang-hyok
- (Maldives) Hassan Adhuham
- (Maldives) Mohamed Rasheed
- (Palestine) Alaa Atiya
- (Palestine) Ashraf Nu'man
- (Palestine) Houssam Wadi
- (Philippines) Juan Luis Guirado
- (Tajikistan) Nuriddin Davronov
- (Tajikistan) Akhtam Khamrakulov
- (Tajikistan) Aleksey Negmatov
- (Turkmenistan) Guwanç Hangeldiýew
- (Turkmenistan) Ruslan Mingazow
- (Turkmenistan) Berdi Şamyradow
- (Turkmenistan) Elman Tagaýew

1 own goal

- (Nepal) Biraj Maharjan (playing against Turkmenistan)

=== Post-tournament team ranking ===
As per statistical convention in football, matches decided in extra time are counted as wins and losses, while matches decided by penalty shoot-outs are counted as draws.

Team	Pld	W	D	L	GF	GA	GD
North Korea	5	5	0	0	12	1	+11
Turkmenistan	5	3	1	1	9	4	+5
Philippines	5	3	0	2	9	8	+1
Palestine	5	2	1	2	7	6	+1
Tajikistan	3	1	0	2	3	4	−1
Maldives	3	1	0	2	2	5	−3
Nepal	3	0	0	3	0	6	−6
India	3	0	0	3	0	8	−8
