= 2010 VFF SonHa Cup =

2010 VFF Cup
Tournament details
- Host country: Vietnam
- Dates: 2–6 November
- Teams: 4
- Venue(s): 1 (in 1 host city)

Final positions
- Champions: North Korea (1st title)
- Runners-up: Singapore
- Third place: South Korea
- Fourth place: Vietnam

Tournament statistics
- Matches played: 6
- Goals scored: 13 (2.17 per match)

The 2010 VFF Cup was the 7th season of the annual football tournament organised in Vietnam, took place on 2–6 November 2011.

== History ==
The 2010 VFF Cup will be mainly sponsored by Son Ha Company to develop football in Vietnam. As of that, this year's competition was named the VFF SonHa Cup.

Traditionally, the VFF Cup is a meeting place between two predestined rivals Vietnam and Thailand. However, Thailand refused to participate in this tournament causing difficulties for the organizers. Finally with the participation of Singapore, Korean and North Korean students believe that the quality of the tournament is guaranteed.

Vietnam Football Federation had invited the national teams of Korea DPR, Singapore, and a South Korean University Selection Team. These team will be competing against the host nation team Vietnam. For this edition of the tournament, Korea DPR squad won the VFF Cup for the first time following their 2–0 victory over Vietnam. Singapore finished second and the South Korean University Selection Team was third.

== Regulation ==
The tournament is decided through a round-robin format with team with the highest point will become the winner.

== Venue ==
Hanoi
Mỹ Đình National Stadium
21°1′14″N 105°45′49.7″E
Capacity: 40,000
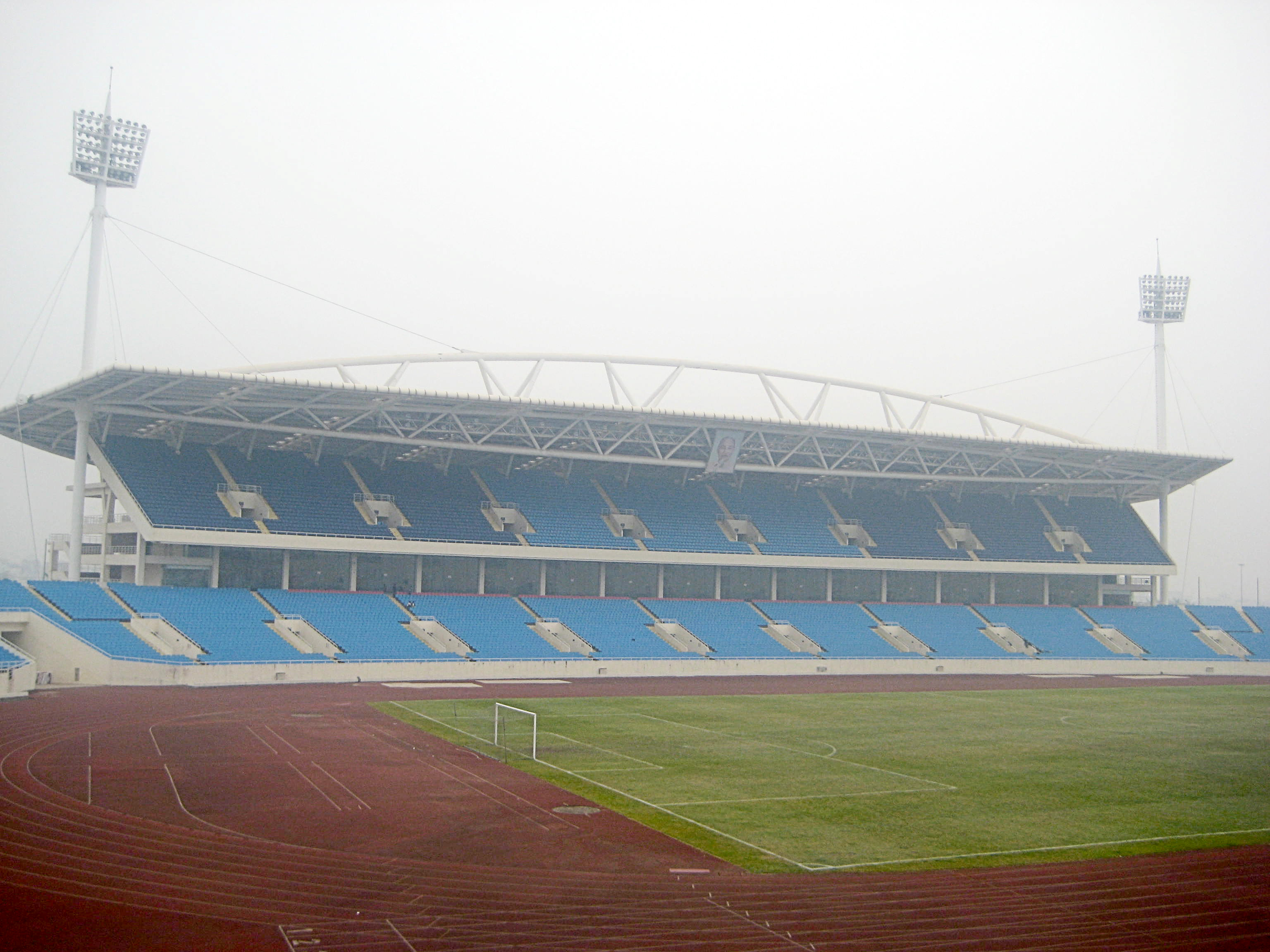

== Result ==
Team	Pld	W	D	L	GF	GA	GD	Pts
Korea DPR	3	2	1	0	5	2	+3	7
Singapore	3	1	1	1	4	3	+1	4
South Korea Universiade	3	1	1	1	3	3	0	4
Vietnam	3	0	1	2	1	5	−4	1

2 November 2010

Korea DPR (North Korea)	2–1	Singapore
	Details

Mỹ Đình National Stadium, Hanoi
2 November 2010

Vietnam	0–2	South Korea Universiade

Mỹ Đình National Stadium, Hanoi
4 November 2010

South Korea Universiade	1–1	(North Korea) Korea DPR

Mỹ Đình National Stadium, Hanoi
4 November 2010

Vietnam	1–1	Singapore
	Details

Mỹ Đình National Stadium, Hanoi
6 November 2010

Singapore	2–0	South Korea Universiade
	Details

Mỹ Đình National Stadium, Hanoi
6 November 2010

Vietnam	0–2	(North Korea) Korea DPR

Mỹ Đình National Stadium, Hanoi
