= Ali Sabbagh =

Lebanese football referee

- Full name: Ali Sabbagh
- Born: 30 June 1979 (age 47); Aramoun, Lebanon
- Other occupation: Teacher

International
Years	League	Role
2008–2013	FIFA	Referee
2008–2013	AFC	Referee

Ali Sabbagh (Arabic: عَلِيّ صَبَّاغ; born 30 June 1979) is a Lebanese former football referee. He was a full international referee for FIFA between 2008 and 2013, before being banned for life from refereeing due to fixing a match in return for sexual favours.

== Career ==
Sabbagh refereed in the 2014 FIFA World Cup qualifiers, beginning with the match between Nepal and Timor-Leste.

On 10 June 2013, the referee was sentenced to six months in jail by a Singapore court, after pleading guilty to influencing two linesmen to help fix an AFC Cup match which took place on 3 April 2013. He and the two linesmen "corruptly receiving gratification in the form of free sexual service", arranged by Singaporean businessman Eric Ding Si Yang. The Asian Football Confederation (AFC) has also banned Sabbagh from refereeing and attending stadiums.

== Honours ==
- Lebanese Premier League Best Referee: 2009–10
