= Mobarak Hossain Bhuyan =

Bangladeshi footballer

Mobarak Bhuyan
Personal information
- Full name: Mobarak Hossain Bhuyan
- Date of birth: 12 December 1990 (age 35)
- Place of birth: Narshingdi, Bangladesh
- Height: 1.56 m (5 ft 1 in)
- Position: Midfielder

Senior career*
Years	Team	Apps	(Gls)
2007–2008	Wari Club		
2008–2011	Sheikh Russel KC		
2011–2016	Mohammedan SC		
2016–2018	Sheikh Russel KC		
2018–2020	Brothers Union	2	(0)

International career
2010–2013	Bangladesh	3	(0)
Medal record
Representing Bangladesh
Men's football
South Asian Games
Gold medal – first place	2010 Bangladesh
- * Club domestic league appearances and goals

Mobarak Hossain Bhuyan (Bengali: মোবারক হোসেন ভূঁইয়ান; born 12 December 1990) is a retired Bangladeshi professional footballer who last played as a midfielder for Sheikh Russel KC. He played for the Bangladesh national team from 2010 to 2013.

== Club career ==
Mobarak entered football through the U-16 JFF Cup, as his team Narsingdi became the champions. He made a name for himself after his brilliant display of performances during the 2013 Super Cup for Mohammedan SC. He was rewarded with both the Best Emerging Player and Most Valuable Player of the tournament awards, as Mohammedan claimed their first Super Cup trophy.

== International career ==
On 31 August 2013, Mobarak made his international debut for Bangladesh against India at the 2013 SAFF Championship. He earned a total of 3 caps for his country, all of which came during the same tournament.

== Personal life ==
Mobarak's father Abdul Gafur Bhuiyan died on 6 July 2018, from a long suffering illness. Nicknamed "Scooter Gafoor" due to his speed, Mobarak's father was also a famous footballer during the 70', and played for clubs such as East Pakistan Government Press, Abahani Krira Chakra, East End Club and Rahmatganj MFS.

== Honours ==
Mohammedan SC

- Super Cup: 2013
- Independence Cup: 2014

Bangladesh U-23

- South Asian Games Gold medal: 2010

=== Individual ===
- 2013 − Super Cup Most Valuable Player Award.
- 2013 − Super Cup Best Emerging Player.
