= Pak Nam-chol (footballer, born 1985) =

North Korean footballer

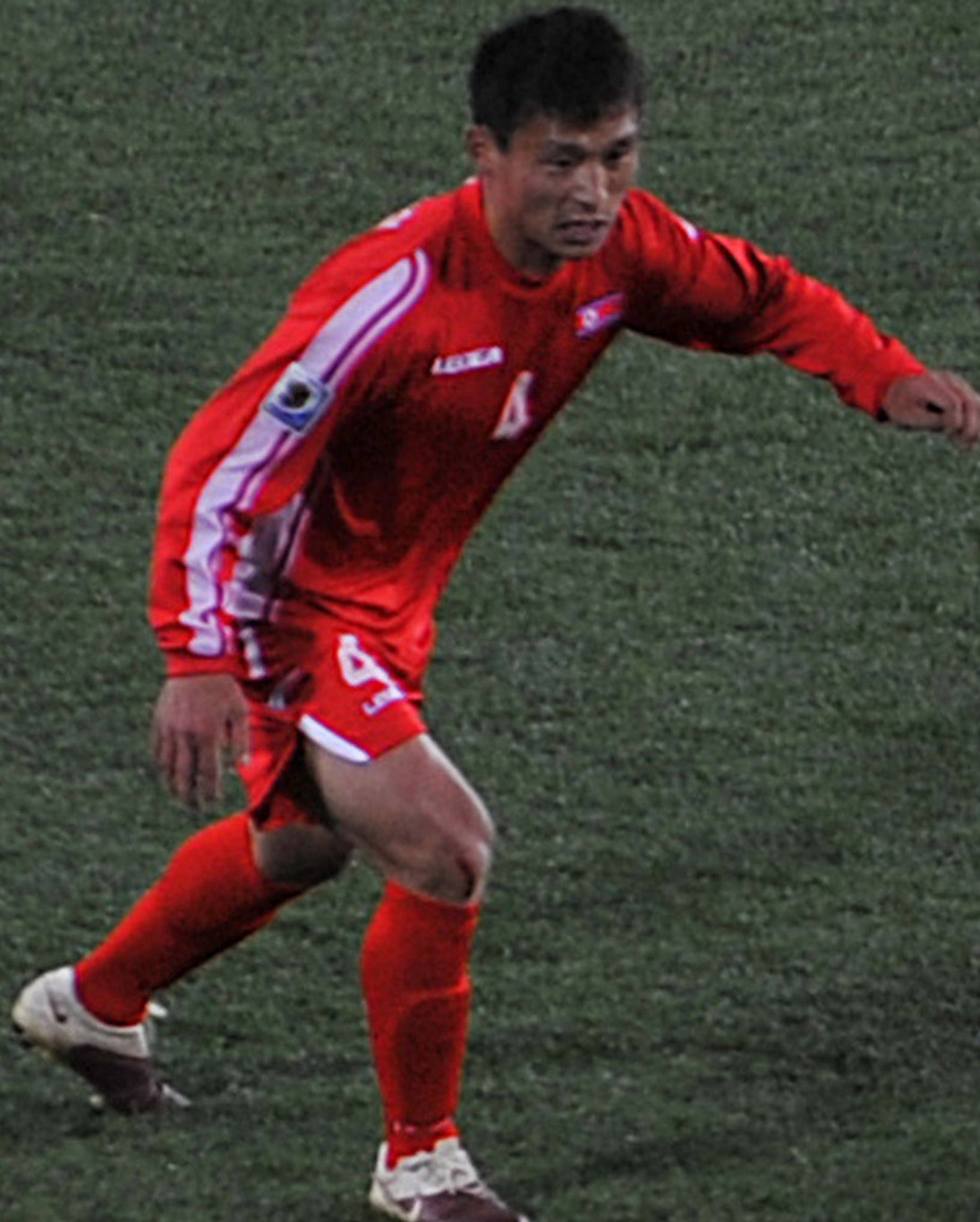
- Pak with North Korea in 2010

Personal information
- Date of birth: 2 July 1985 (age 41)
- Place of birth: Pyongyang, North Korea
- Height: 1.72 m (5 ft 8 in)
- Positions: Attacking midfielder; winger

Senior career*
Years	Team	Apps	(Gls)
2004–2012	April 25		
2009–2011	→ Rubin Kazan (loan)	17	(3)
2012–2014	Muangthong United	17	(1)
2014	→ Sisaket (loan)	4	(1)

International career
2004–2012	North Korea	74	(14)
- * Club domestic league appearances and goals

- Pak Nam-chol
- Hangul: 박남철
- RR: Bak Namcheol
- MR: Pak Namch'ŏl

Pak Nam-chol (Korean: 박남철; Hancha: 朴男哲; born 2 July 1985) is a North Korean former professional footballer who played as an attacking midfielder. Pak appeared for North Korea in various FIFA World Cup qualifying matches from 2006, scoring three goals. He was also part of the North Korea squad that qualified and played at the 2010 FIFA World Cup.

== Career statistics ==
Scores and results list North Korea's goal tally first.

#	Date	Venue	Opponent	Score	Result	Competition
1.	11 March 2005	Zhongshan Soccer Stadium, Taipei	Guam	19–0	21–0	2005 East Asian Championship
2.	4 July 2007	Jurong West Stadium, Singapore	Saudi Arabia	1–1	1–1	Friendly
3.	28 March 2009	Kim Il-sung Stadium, Pyongyang	United Arab Emirates	1–0	2–0	2010 FIFA World Cup qualifier
4.	23 August 2009	World Games Stadium, Kaohsiung	Guam	2–1	9–2	2010 East Asian Championship
5.	7 April 2011	Halchowk Stadium, Kathmandu	Sri Lanka	4–0	4–0	2012 AFC Challenge Cup qualifier
6.	6 September 2011	Yanggakdo Stadium, Pyongyang	Tajikistan	1–0	1–0	2014 FIFA World Cup qualifier
7.	15 November 2011	Kim Il-sung Stadium, Pyongyang	Japan	1–0	1–0	2014 FIFA World Cup qualifier
8.	9 March 2012	Halchowk Stadium, Kathmandu	Philippines	1–0	2–0	2012 AFC Challenge Cup
9.	11 March 2012	Halchowk Stadium, Kathmandu	Tajikistan	1–0	2–0	2012 AFC Challenge Cup
10.	13 March 2012	Dasarath Rangasala Stadium, Kathmandu	India	3–0	4–0	2012 AFC Challenge Cup
11.	10 September 2012	Gelora Bung Karno Stadium, Jakarta	Indonesia	1–0	2–0	Friendly
12.	1 December 2012	Mong Kok Stadium, Hong Kong	Chinese Taipei	4–0	6–1	2013 EAFF East Asian Cup
13.	3 December 2012	Mong Kok Stadium, Hong Kong	Guam	4–0	5–0	2013 EAFF East Asian Cup
14.	9 December 2012	Hong Kong Stadium, Hong Kong	Hong Kong	3–0	4–0	2013 EAFF East Asian Cup

== Honours ==
North Korea

- AFC Challenge Cup: 2012

Individual

- AFC Challenge Cup Most Valuable Player: 2012
