= Jang Kuk-chol =

North Korean footballer (born 1994)

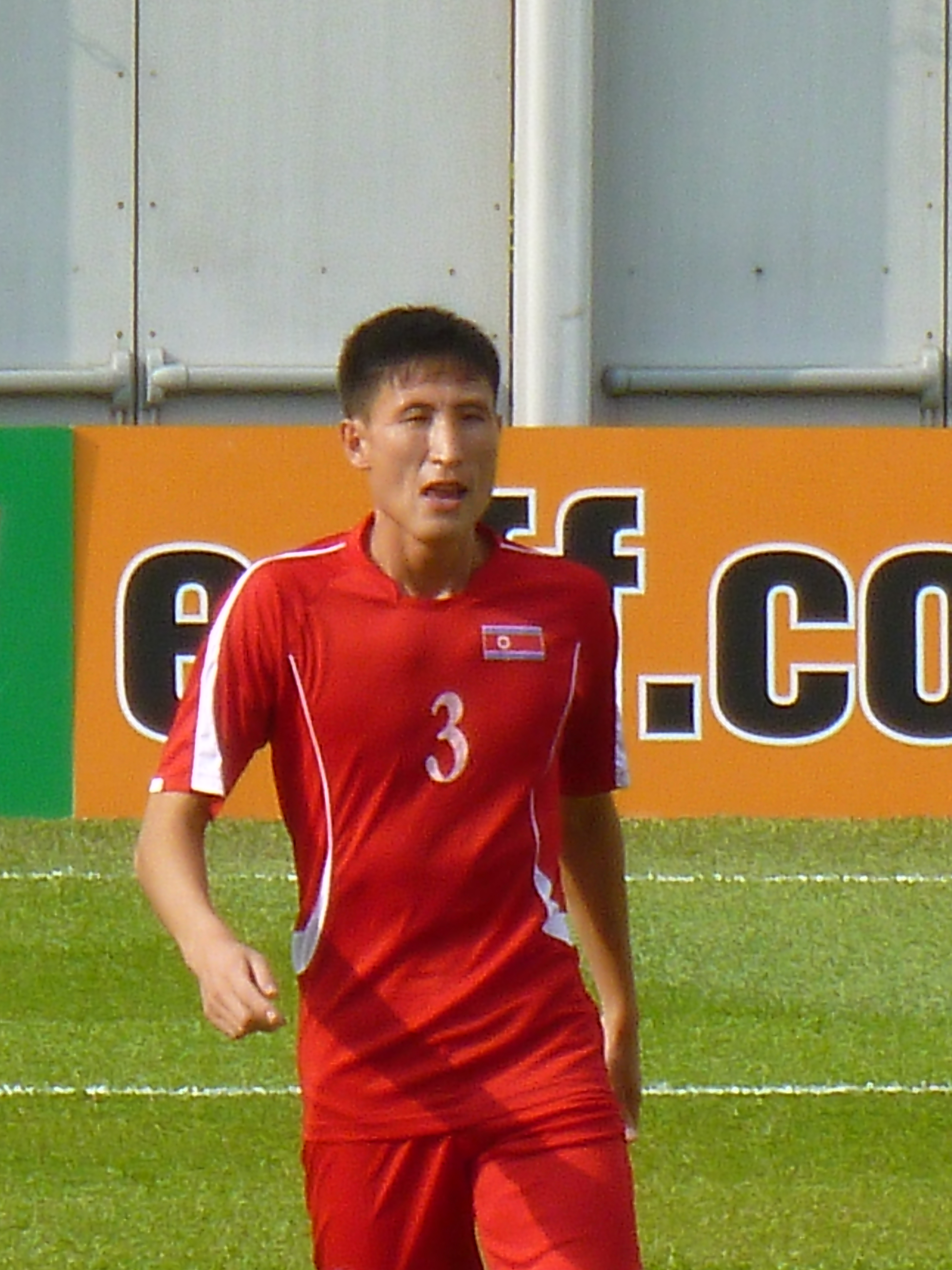
- Jang with North Korea at the 2017 EAFF E-1 Football Championship

Personal information
- Date of birth: 16 February 1994 (age 32)
- Place of birth: Pyongyang, North Korea
- Height: 1.83 m (6 ft 0 in)
- Position: Centre-back

Team information
- Current team: Hwaebul
- Number: 3

Senior career*
Years	Team	Apps	(Gls)
2010	Kyonggongop		
2011–2013	Rimyongsu		
2014–	Hwaebul		

International career^{‡}
2011–2013	North Korea U23	17	(4)
2012–	North Korea	59	(5)
- * Club domestic league appearances and goals ‡ National team caps and goals as of 10 September 2019

- Jang Kuk-chol
- Hangul: 장국철
- Hanja: 張國哲
- RR: Jang Gukcheol
- MR: Chang Kukch'ŏl

Jang Kuk-chol (Korean: 장국철; born 16 February 1994) is a North Korean professional footballer who plays primarily as a centre-back for DPR Korea Premier Football League club Hwaebul and captains the North Korea national team.

== Club career ==
Jang opened his continental account when he scored the opening goal for Hwaebul in a 3–0 win against Erchim in Pyongyang, pouncing on a deep cross by Hyon Chol-bom. Hwaebul won the tie 7–0 on aggregate, with Jang earning the Man of the Match award.

Despite playing in both qualifying games, Jang was not part of the matchday squads for the first two AFC Cup games against April 25 and Benfica Macau. He would return against Hang Yuan and play the rest of the group stage games. In the return leg against Macau, Jang would allow Carlos Leonel to head in the opener. Hwaebul finished third in the group, ending their Asian campaign.

== International career ==
Only 18 years old, Jang made his international debut for the Chollima on 26 March 2011 against Iraq in a 1–0 defeat. He'd score his first goal in the next year during the 2012 AFC Challenge Cup against the Philippines after poking in a spill from Neil Etheridge four minutes after coming on. He scored his second goal in the same tournament against Tajikistan, also as a substitute.

During a World Cup Qualifier match against Uzbekistan on 16 June 2015, he scored his third for the nation after his late run into the box met a cross for a powerful header. Jang scored his fourth international goal against Chinese Taipei during the 2019 EAFF Championship qualifiers when he nodded in Jong Il-gwan's cross into the box. Despite going unbeaten in the second round, the country did not progress to the final stage.

Jang was called up for his second ever Asian Cup held in the United Arab Emirates. He didn't feature in the 6–0 defeat against Qatar. Jang skippered the country for the first time against Lebanon after Jong's absence through a red card suspension. They lost 4–1. Jang was appointed captain again in the next match in a 4–0 friendly defeat to Uzbekistan.

Jang played an instrumental role for his nation's triumph in the 2019 Intercontinental Cup but didn't take part in the final due to suspension. His fifth goal came against Sri Lanka in the 2022 World Cup qualifiers pouncing on a cross.

After a four year absence from international football due to North Korea closing their borders, Jang returned to the international stage when he was called up for the 2022 Asian Games held in China as captain. He was one of the three overaged players called up to the squad. During the game against Japan, the North Koreans fell 2–1 after a penalty was awarded to the Japanese. The decision led to frustration that was carried over after the game ended as Jang was seen remonstrating at the referee Rustam Lutfullin. Alongside with him was Kim Kyong-sok who was shoving Lutfullin, as well as the two other overaged players Kang ju-hyok and Kim Kuk-bom. Although he was arguing and showing his anger towards Lutfullin, Jang was also seen trying to separate his teammates from the officials.

On September 10, 2024, Jang received a red card against Qatar National Football Team in Round 3 of World Cup Qualification, after denying an obvious goal scoring opportunity, tackling Akram Afif in the box.

== Career statistics ==
=== International goals ===
Scores and results list North Korea's goal tally first.

#	Date	Venue	Opponent	Score	Result	Competition
1	9 March 2012	Halchowk Stadium, Kathmandu	Philippines	2–0	2–0	2012 AFC Challenge Cup
2	11 March 2012	Halchowk Stadium, Kathmandu	Tajikistan	2–0	2–0	2012 AFC Challenge Cup
3	16 June 2015	Kim Il Sung Stadium, Pyongyang	Uzbekistan	2–0	4–2	2018 FIFA World Cup qualification
4.	16 November 2018	Taipei Municipal Stadium, Taipei	Chinese Taipei	2–0	2–0	2019 EAFF E-1 Championship qualification
5.	10 September 2019	Colombo Racecourse, Colombo	Sri Lanka	1–0	1–0	2022 FIFA World Cup qualification

== Honours ==
North Korea U20

- AFC U-19 Championship: 2010
