= Andre El Haddad =

Lebanese football referee

- Full name: Andre El Haddad
- Born: 8 February 1971 (age 55); Zahlé, Lebanon

International
Years	League	Role
2007–2013	FIFA listed	Referee
2010–2013	AFC Elite	Referee

Andre El Haddad (Arabic: اندريه الحداد; born 8 February 1971) is a Lebanese former football referee. He was a FIFA listed referee between 2007 and 2013, and has officiated several international and continental competitions.

== Refereeing career ==
El Haddad was a referee in several AFC Champions League matches between 2011 and 2013. He has officiated 16 matches, giving out a total of 53 yellow cards.

He was the referee for the 2014 FIFA World Cup qualification third round match between China and Singapore held on 2 September 2011.

In February 2012, in the final game of the Third Round of AFC qualifying, El Haddad refereed the match between Bahrain and Indonesia, who were without many of its most experienced players due to a dispute between the two competing Indonesian national leagues. Going into the match, Bahrain needed at least a nine-goal victory over Indonesia, in addition to a defeat by group rivals Qatar in against Iran in order to advance to the fourth round of qualifying. Bahrain won the match 10–0, a record victory for Bahrain and a record defeat for Indonesia.
