= Berdi Şamyradow =

Turkmen football player

Personal information
- Full name: Berdi Bayrammyradovich Shamyradov
- Date of birth: 22 June 1982 (age 44)
- Place of birth: Ashkhabad, Turkmen SSR, USSR (now Ashgabat, Turkmenistan)
- Position: Striker

Team information
- Current team: Nebitçi (assistant coach)

Senior career*
Years	Team	Apps	(Gls)
2002–2003	FC Ahal		(1)
2004	HTTU Aşgabat		(19)
2004–2005	FK Karvan	5	(0)
2005–2010	HTTU Aşgabat		(106)
2011–2012	FC Aşgabat		
2012–2013	HTTU Aşgabat		
2014	Altyn Asyr		
2015–2017	Ashgabat		(3)

International career^{‡}
2008–2015	Turkmenistan	24	(10)

Managerial career
- 2020–: Nebitçi (assistant)
- * Club domestic league appearances and goals ‡ National team caps and goals as of 19 November 2015

Berdi Bayrammyradovich Shamyradov or Berdi Baýrammyradowiç Şamyradow (Russian: Берды Байраммуратович Шамуратов, romanized: Berdy Bayrammuratovich Shamuratov; born 22 June 1982) is a Turkmen football coach and a former professional player. Currently, he works as assistant manager at FC Nebitçi Balkanabat.

== Early life ==
Football started in six years. First coach — Andreý Skripçenko. Then worked with Boris Grigorýans.

He graduated from the International Turkmen-Turkish University.

== Club career ==
Professional career began at Ahal FK.

In the 1st half of 2004/05 season he played for Azerbaijan Karvan FK. However performed badly, so never and can not be distinguished.

He is six-times top goalscorer of Ýokary Liga. In 2009, Şamyradow shattered the all-times Ýokary Liga top scorer title of Rejepmyrat Agabaýew. In 2010, he became all-time Ýokary Liga top scorer.

In 2013, at HTTU early in the season won the Supercup of Turkmenistan, and at the end of the season won the gold medal in the 2013 Ýokary Liga

Season 2014 started as a player Altyn Asyr FK. He won the gold medal in the 2014 Ýokary Liga.

From 2015 FC Aşgabat player.

== International career ==
Şamyradow scored his first international goal in the 2008 Ho Chi Minh City International Football Cup against hosts Vietnam, helping Turkmenistan win the tournament. Together with the team twice went to the AFC Challenge Cup final.

== Coaching career ==
After completing his football career, he worked as a teacher at the Turkmen State Institute of Physical Education and Sports.

In the spring of 2020, Şamyradow got a job at Sports School No. 10 of the Main Department of Sports and Youth Policy of Ashgabat.

In August 2020, he was appointed an assistant coach at FC Nebitçi with Amangylyç Koçumow as the head coach.

== International goals ==
#	Date	Venue	Opponent	Score	Result	Competition
1.	October 3, 2008	Thong Nhat Stadium, Ho Chi Minh City	Vietnam	1–1	3–2	2008 HCM City Int'l Football Cup
2.	April 14, 2009	Rasmee Dhandu Stadium, Malé	Maldives	2–1	3–1	2010 AFC Challenge Cup qualifier
3.	April 18, 2009	Rasmee Dhandu Stadium, Malé	Philippines	2–0	5–0	2010 AFC Challenge Cup qualifier
4.	April 18, 2009	Rasmee Dhandu Stadium, Malé	Philippines	4–0	5–0	2010 AFC Challenge Cup qualifier
5.	October 22, 2009	Thong Nhat Stadium, Ho Chi Minh City	Singapore	1–1	2–4	2009 HCM City Int'l Football Cup
6.	February 27, 2010	Sugathadasa Stadium, Colombo	North Korea	1–0	1–1	2010 AFC Challenge Cup
7.	March 23, 2011	MBPJ Stadium, Petaling Jaya	Chinese Taipei	1–0	2–0	2012 AFC Challenge Cup qualifier
8.	July 28, 2011	Gelora Bung Karno Stadium, Jakarta	Indonesia	2–4	3–4	2014 FIFA World Cup qualifier
9.	March 19, 2012	Dasarath Rangasala Stadium, Kathmandu	North Korea	1–0	1–2	2012 AFC Challenge Cup

== Honors ==
- AFC Challenge Cup:

Runners-up: 2010, 2012

- Ho Chi Minh City International Football Cup

Winner: 2008
