= 2010 AFC Challenge Cup =

Tournament details
- Host country: Sri Lanka
- Dates: 16–27 February
- Venues: 2 (in 1 host city)

Final positions
- Champions: North Korea (1st title)
- Runners-up: Turkmenistan
- Third place: Tajikistan
- Fourth place: Myanmar

Tournament statistics
- Matches played: 16
- Goals scored: 44 (2.75 per match)
- Attendance: 12,550 (784 per match)
- Top scorer(s): (North Korea) Ryang Yong-gi (4 goals)
- Best player: (North Korea) Ryang Yong-gi

The 2010 AFC Challenge Cup was the third edition of the tournament which was held from 16–27 February 2010 in Sri Lanka. India, the defending champions, fielded their under-23 team for this tournament in preparation for the 2010 Asian Games later that year. (Note: All matches involving India will not count as full international matches as they fielded their under-23 team in this tournament.) The champions, North Korea, qualified for the 2011 Asian Cup.

== Qualification ==
The finals saw three automatic qualifiers joined by five teams from the qualification phase. Qualification consisted of two sections.

- A playoff between the 19th and 20th ranked entrants (Mongolia and Macau)
- Four qualification groups for four teams. Each group winner advanced to the finals, along with the best-ranked runner-up. Because of the withdrawal of Afghanistan the ranking of second-placed teams was excluded results of any matches against fourth-placed sides.

=== Qualifiers ===
Qualifiers for the final tournament were:

- India U23 (Automatic Qualifier)
- North Korea (Automatic Qualifier)
- Tajikistan (Automatic Qualifier)
- Myanmar (Winner Qualification Group A)
- Turkmenistan (Winner Qualification Group B)
- Kyrgyzstan (Winner Qualification Group C)
- Sri Lanka (Winner Qualification Group D)
- Bangladesh (Best Runner-up)

The draw for the final tournament was held on 30 November 2009 at the Galadari Hotel in Colombo, Sri Lanka.

== Venues ==
Colombo
Sugathadasa Stadium	CR & FC Grounds
Capacity: 25,000	Capacity: 5,550
2010 AFC Challenge Cup is located in Sri Lanka

== Match officials ==
The following referees were chosen for the 2010 AFC Challenge Cup.

Referees	Assistant Referees
(Bahrain) Nawaf Abdulla (China) Tan Hai (Iran) Alireza Faghani (Japan) Hajime Matsuo (Lebanon) Andre El Haddad (Thailand) Chaiya Mahapab (Yemen) Mukhtar Al Yarimi	(Bahrain) Ebrahim Mubarak (China) Huo Weiming (India) Shaji Kurian (Iran) Morteza Karimi (Japan) Toshiyuki Nagi (Lebanon) Ahmad El Kawas (Malaysia) Mohd Sabri Mat Daud (Oman) Hamed Al Mayahi (Yemen) Hussein Shukran

== Group stage ==
All times are Sri Lanka Time (SLT) – UTC+5:30

Key to colours in group tables
Top two placed teams advance to the semi-finals

=== Tie-breaking criteria ===
Where two or more teams end the group stage with the same number of points, their ranking is determined by the following criteria:

1. points earned in the matches between the teams concerned;
2. goal difference in the matches between the teams concerned;
3. number of goals scored in the group matches between the teams concerned;
4. goal difference in all group matches;
5. number of goals scored in all group matches;
6. kicks from the penalty mark (if only two teams are level and they are both on the field of play);
7. fewer yellow and red cards received in the group matches;
8. drawing of lots by the organising committee.

=== Group A ===
Team	Pld	W	D	L	GF	GA	GD	Pts
Tajikistan	3	2	0	1	7	3	+4	6
Myanmar	3	2	0	1	6	4	+2	6
Sri Lanka (H)	3	1	0	2	4	7	−3	3
Bangladesh	3	1	0	2	3	6	−3	3

Source: RSSSF
(H) Hosts
16 February 2010
16:00

Tajikistan	1–2	Bangladesh
Rabiev 70'	Report	Enamul 67'; Meshu 74'

Sugathadasa Stadium, Colombo
Attendance: 1,000
Referee: Hajime Matsuo (Japan)
16 February 2010
19:00

Myanmar	4–0	Sri Lanka
Kyaw Thiha 39'; Yan Paing 71'; Pai Soe 81'; Myo Min Tun 87'	Report

Sugathadasa Stadium, Colombo
Attendance: 3,000
Referee: Alireza Faghani (Iran)

18 February 2010
16:00

Sri Lanka	1–3	Tajikistan
Dalpethado 78'	Report	Rabimov 13'; Fatkhuloev 32', 90+2'

Sugathadasa Stadium, Colombo
Attendance: 1,000
Referee: Tan Hai (China PR)
18 February 2010
19:00

Bangladesh	1–2	Myanmar
Zahid Hossain 49'	Report	Tun Tun Win 16'; Pai Soe 32'

Sugathadasa Stadium, Colombo
Attendance: 500
Referee: Mukhtar Al Yarimi (Yemen)

20 February 2010
15:00

Tajikistan	3–0	Myanmar
Rabimov 33'; Hakimov 52'; Rabiev 88'	Report

CR & FC Grounds, Colombo
Attendance: 100
Referee: Nawaf Shukralla (Bahrain)
20 February 2010
15:00

Sri Lanka	3–0	Bangladesh
Kaiz 7'; Gunarathna 43'; Sanjeev 79'	Report

Sugathadasa Stadium, Colombo
Attendance: 600
Referee: Chaiya Mahapab (Thailand)

=== Group B ===
Team	Pld	W	D	L	GF	GA	GD	Pts
North Korea	3	2	1	0	8	1	+7	7
Turkmenistan	3	2	1	0	3	1	+2	7
Kyrgyzstan	3	1	0	2	2	6	−4	3
India U23	3	0	0	3	1	6	−5	0

Source: RSSSF
17 February 2010
16:00

India U23	1–2	Kyrgyzstan
Franco 58' (pen.)	Report	I. Amirov 15'; Zemlianuhin 32'

Sugathadasa Stadium, Colombo
Attendance: 800
Referee: Nawaf Shukralla (Bahrain)
17 February 2010
19:00

North Korea	1–1	Turkmenistan
Ryang Yong-gi 51'	Report	Garadanow 36'

Sugathadasa Stadium, Colombo
Attendance: 400
Referee: Chaiya Mahapab (Thailand)

19 February 2010
16:00

Kyrgyzstan	0–4	North Korea
	Report	Pak Song-chol 29'; Pak Kwang-ryong 47'; Choe Myong-ho 65'; Ri Chol-myong 68'

Sugathadasa Stadium, Colombo
Attendance: 300
Referee: Andre El Haddad (Lebanon)
19 February 2010
19:00

Turkmenistan	1–0	India U23
Garadanow 24' (pen.)	Report

Sugathadasa Stadium, Colombo
Attendance: 450
Referee: Hajime Matsuo (Japan)

21 February 2010
15:00

India U23	0–3	North Korea
	Report	Ryang Yong-gi 36', 72'; Choe Chol-man 57'

Sugathadasa Stadium, Colombo
Attendance: 300
Referee: Tan Hai (China PR)
21 February 2010
15:00

Turkmenistan	1–0	Kyrgyzstan
Nurmyradow 70'	Report

CR & FC Grounds, Colombo
Attendance: 100
Referee: Andre El Haddad (Lebanon)

== Knockout stage ==
Semi-finals
24 February – Colombo
Tajikistan	0
Turkmenistan	2
24 February – Colombo
North Korea	5
Myanmar	0

Final
27 February – Colombo
Turkmenistan	1 (4)
North Korea (p)	1 (5)
Third place
27 February – Colombo
Tajikistan	1
Myanmar	0

=== Semi-finals ===
24 February 2010
15:30

Tajikistan	0–2	Turkmenistan
	Report	Amanow 33'; Urazow 42'

Sugathadasa Stadium, Colombo
Attendance: 300
Referee: Alireza Faghani (Iran)

24 February 2010
19:00

North Korea	5–0	Myanmar
Choe Myong-ho 6'; Choe Chol-man 12', 73'; Pak Song-chol 13'; Kim Seong-yong 85'	Report

Sugathadasa Stadium, Colombo
Attendance: 400
Referee: Mukhtar Al Yarimi (Yemen)

=== Third place match ===
27 February 2010
15:30

Tajikistan	1–0	Myanmar
Hakimov 11'	Report

Sugathadasa Stadium, Colombo
Attendance: 300
Referee: Andre El Haddad (Lebanon)

=== Final ===
27 February 2010
19:00

Turkmenistan	1–1	North Korea
Şamyradow 33'	Report	Ryang Yong-gi 75'
Penalties
Öwekow (penalty scored); Garadanow (penalty missed); Şamyradow (penalty scored); Rejepow (penalty scored); Nurmyradow (penalty scored); Amanow (penalty missed)	4–5	(penalty scored) Pak Song-chol; (penalty scored) Ryang Yong-gi; (penalty scored) Chae Tu-yong; (penalty scored) Pak Yong-jin; (penalty missed) Ri Chol-myong; (penalty scored) Ri Kwang-hyok

Sugathadasa Stadium, Colombo
Attendance: 3,000
Referee: Alireza Faghani (Iran)

== Winner ==
2010 AFC Challenge Cup champions

North Korea
First title

== Awards ==
Fair Play Award	Golden Shoe	Most Valuable Player
North Korea	(North Korea) Ryang Yong-gi	(North Korea) Ryang Yong-gi

== Goalscorers ==
4 goals

- (North Korea) Ryang Yong-gi

3 goals

- (North Korea) Choe Chol-man

2 goals

- (Myanmar) Pai Soe
- (North Korea) Choe Myong-ho
- (North Korea) Pak Song-chol
- (Tajikistan) Fatkhullo Fatkhuloev
- (Tajikistan) Numonjon Hakimov
- (Tajikistan) Yusuf Rabiev
- (Tajikistan) Ibrahim Rabimov
- (Turkmenistan) Mämmedaly Garadanow

1 goal

- (Bangladesh) Enamul Hoque
- (Bangladesh) Mohamed Zahid Hossain
- (Bangladesh) Atiqur Rahman Meshu
- (India) Denzil Franco
- (Kyrgyzstan) Ildar Amirov
- (Kyrgyzstan) Anton Zemlianuhin
- (Myanmar) Kyaw Thiha
- (Myanmar) Myo Min Tun
- (Myanmar) Tun Tun Win
- (Myanmar) Yan Paing
- (North Korea) Kim Seong-yong
- (North Korea) Pak Kwang-ryong
- (North Korea) Ri Chol-myong
- (Sri Lanka) Philip Dalpethado
- (Sri Lanka) Chathura Gunarathna
- (Sri Lanka) Shafraz Kaiz
- (Sri Lanka) S. Sanjeev
- (Turkmenistan) Arslanmyrat Amanow
- (Turkmenistan) Begli Nurmyradow
- (Turkmenistan) Berdi Şamyradow
- (Turkmenistan) Didargylyç Urazow
