= Ryang Yong-gi =

Zainichi Korean footballer (born 1982)

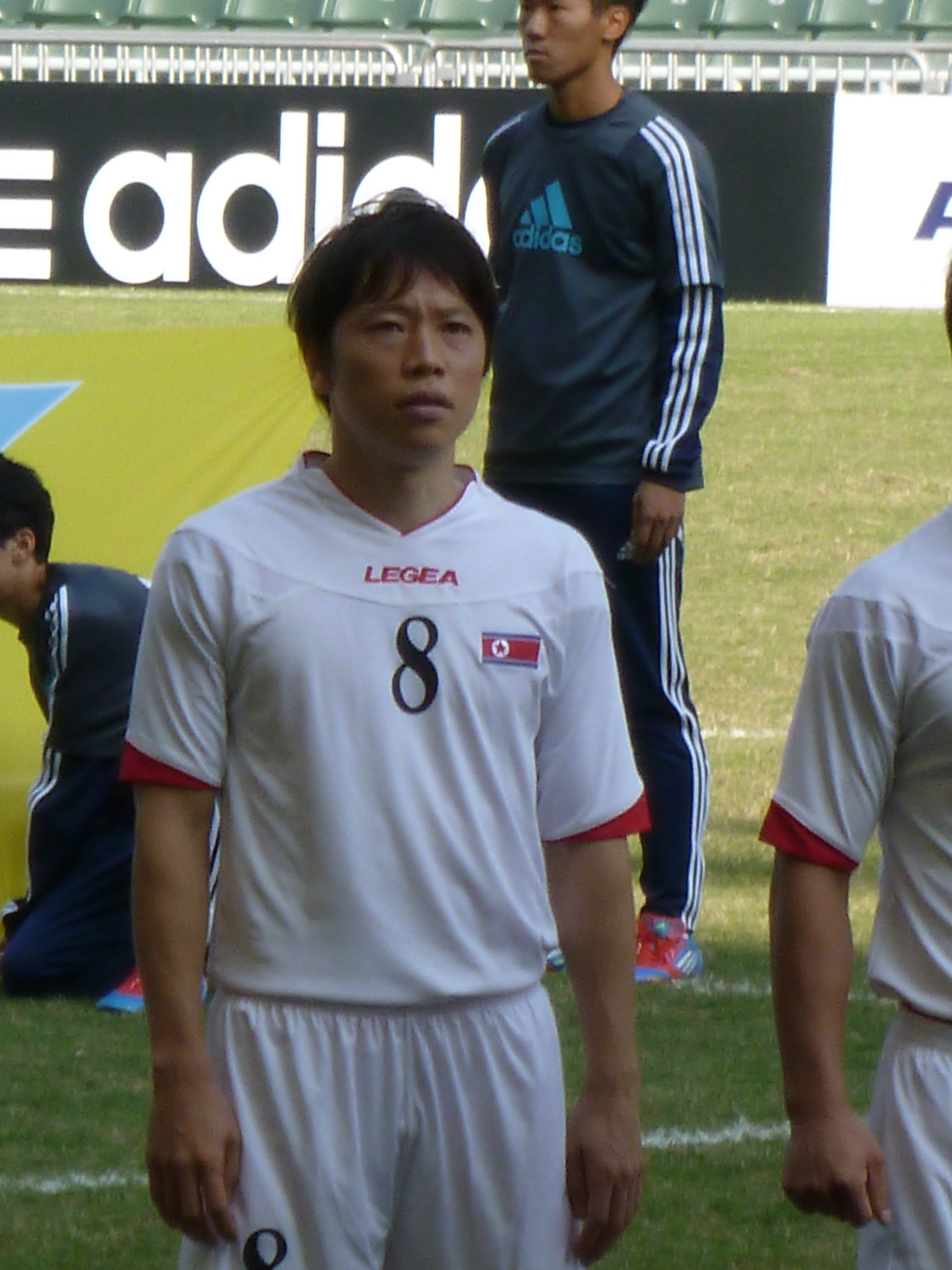
- Yong-gi with DPR Korea in 2012

Personal information
- Date of birth: 7 January 1982 (age 44)
- Place of birth: Tadaoka, Osaka, Japan
- Height: 1.72 m (5 ft 8 in)
- Position: Midfielder

College career
Years	Team	Apps	(Gls)
2000–2003	Hannan University		

Senior career*
Years	Team	Apps	(Gls)
2004–2019	Vegalta Sendai	522	(76)
2020–2022	Sagan Tosu	29	(0)
2022–2023	Vegalta Sendai	26	(0)

International career^{‡}
2008–2017	North Korea	26	(7)
- * Club domestic league appearances and goals as of 18 December 2023, 14:44 (UTC) ‡ National team caps and goals as of 19 July 2020, 16:20 (UTC)

- Ryang Yong-gi
- Hangul: 량용기
- Hanja: 梁勇基
- RR: Ryang Yonggi
- MR: Ryang Yonggi

Ryang Yong-gi (Korean: 량용기; Hancha: 梁勇基; born 7 January 1982) is a former professional footballer who played as a midfielder. Born in Japan, he represented North Korea internationally.

Ryang served as the captain of his club where he played as a creative midfielder.

Ryang has made one appearance for the Korea DPR national football team in the 2010 FIFA World Cup qualifying rounds and was named as one of the North Korean squad for the 2010 AFC Challenge Cup. Ryang won the Golden Boot and Most Valuable Player awards at the competition that guided Korea DPR to win the title and qualify for 2011 AFC Asian Cup.

== 2011 Tōhoku earthquake and tsunami ==
During the 2011 Tōhoku earthquake and tsunami, Ryang was out driving when it hit. "I thought my tires had gone flat or I had driven over the curb, but the shaking continued and I saw the windows of shops shaking too," he recalled. "I knew it was a bad one and rushed home to see my wife." Ryang and his heavily pregnant wife spent the night sleeping in their car, fearful of further damage to buildings in an urban landscape that suffered severe wreckage.

In the aftermath of the disaster, Ryang and his teammates made frequent visits to affected areas to lend support.

== Career statistics ==
=== Club ===
As of the end 2023 season

Appearances and goals by club, season and competition
Club	Season	League			National Cup		League Cup		Continental		Total	
Club	Season	Division	Apps	Goals	Apps	Goals	Apps	Goals	Apps	Goals	Apps	Goals
Vegalta Sendai	2004	J2 League	32	2	2	0	—		—		34	2
Vegalta Sendai	2005	J2 League	39	6	1	0	—		—		40	6
Vegalta Sendai	2006	J2 League	42	4	1	0	—		—		43	4
Vegalta Sendai	2007	J2 League	48	8	1	0	—		—		49	8
Vegalta Sendai	2008	J2 League	42	13	0	0	—		—		42	13
Vegalta Sendai	2009	J2 League	51	14	4	1	—		—		55	15
Vegalta Sendai	2010	J1 League	34	11	0	0	3	0	—		37	11
Vegalta Sendai	2011	J1 League	34	4	0	0	3	0	—		37	4
Vegalta Sendai	2012	J1 League	27	3	1	0	5	1	—		33	4
Vegalta Sendai	2013	J1 League	30	4	4	1	2	0	5	1	41	6
Vegalta Sendai	2014	J1 League	33	2	1	0	5	0	—		40	2
Vegalta Sendai	2015	J1 League	33	3	3	0	5	1	—		41	4
Vegalta Sendai	2016	J1 League	26	0	0	0	1	0	—		27	0
Vegalta Sendai	2017	J1 League	24	2	1	0	1	0	—		26	2
Vegalta Sendai	2018	J1 League	14	0	2	0	3	0	—		19	0
Vegalta Sendai	2019	J1 League	13	0	0	0	8	1	—		21	1
Vegalta Sendai	Total		522	76	21	2	36	3	5	1	584	81
Sagan Tosu	2020	J1 League	22	0	-	-	2	0	—		24	0
Sagan Tosu	2021	J1 League	7	0	0	0	1	0	—		8	0
Sagan Tosu	Total		29	0	0	0	3	0	ー	ー	32	0
Vegalta Sendai	2022	J2 League	15	-	1	0	-	-	—		16	0
Vegalta Sendai	2023	J2 League	11	0	2	0	-	-	—		13	0
Career total			577	76	24	2	39	3	5	1	645	81

=== International ===
As of match played 18 July 2020

Appearances and goals by national team and year
National team	Year	Apps	Goals
North Korea
North Korea	2008	2	0
North Korea	2009	1	0
North Korea	2010	7	5
North Korea	2011	9	0
North Korea	2012	3	1
North Korea	2013	0	0
North Korea	2014	0	0
North Korea	2015	3	1
North Korea	2016	0	0
North Korea	2017	1	0
Total		26	7

==== International goals ====
As of goal scored on 14 January 2015
Scores and results list North Korea's goal tally first, score column indicates score after each Ryang goal.

List of international goals scored by Ryang Yong-gi
No.	Date	Venue	Opponent	Score	Result	Competition	Ref.
1	17 February 2010	Sugathadasa Stadium, Colombo, Sri Lanka	Turkmenistan	1–0	1–1	2010 AFC Challenge Cup	
2	21 February 2010	Sugathadasa Stadium, Colombo, Sri Lanka	India	1–0	3–0	2010 AFC Challenge Cup	
3	21 February 2010	Sugathadasa Stadium, Colombo, Sri Lanka	India	3–0	3–0	2010 AFC Challenge Cup	
4	27 February 2010	Sugathadasa Stadium, Colombo, Sri Lanka	Turkmenistan	1–0	1–1	2010 AFC Challenge Cup	
5	31 December 2010	Abdullah bin Khalifa Stadium, Doha, Qatar	Turkmenistan	1–0	1–0	Friendly	
6	9 December 2012	Hong Kong Stadium, Wanchai, Hong Kong	Hong Kong	2–0	4–0	2013 EAFF East Asian Cup Preliminary round 2	
7	14 January 2015	AAMI Park, Melbourne, Australia	Saudi Arabia	1–0	1–4	2015 AFC Asian Cup	

== Honours ==
Vegalta Sendai

- J. League Division 2: 2009

North Korea

- AFC Challenge Cup: 2010

Individual

- Individual Fair-Play Award: 2011
- Monthly Best Goal: 2015
