= Begli Nurmyradow =

Turkmenistan footballer

Personal information
- Date of birth: May 27, 1981 (age 45)
- Place of birth: Turkmenistan, Soviet Union
- Position: Defender

Team information
- Current team: HTTU Aşgabat

Senior career*
Years	Team	Apps	(Gls)
2006–	HTTU Aşgabat	?	(?)

International career^{‡}
	Turkmenistan	5	(1)
- * Club domestic league appearances and goals as of February 22, 2010 ‡ National team caps and goals as of February 22, 2010

Begli Nurmyradow (born May 27, 1981) is a Turkmen footballer (defender) playing currently for HTTU Aşgabat. He scored one critical goal in the game versus Kyrgyzstan in 2010 AFC Challenge Cup.

== International Career Statistics ==
=== Goals for Senior National Team ===
#	Date	Venue	Opponent	Score	Result	Competition
	February 21, 2010	Colombo, Sri Lanka	Kyrgyzstan	1–0	Won	2010 AFC Challenge Cup
