= Ri Chol-myong =

North Korean footballer

Personal information
- Full name: Ri Chol-myong
- Date of birth: 18 February 1988 (age 38)
- Place of birth: Pyongyang, North Korea
- Height: 1.73 m (5 ft 8 in)
- Position: Midfielder

Team information
- Current team: Pyongyang City
- Number: 8

Senior career*
Years	Team	Apps	(Gls)
2006–	Pyongyang City	?	(?)

International career^{‡}
2007–2016	Korea DPR	47	(7)
- * Club domestic league appearances and goals ‡ National team caps and goals as of November 17, 2015

- Ri Chol-myong
- Hangul: 리철명
- RR: Ri Cheolmyeong
- MR: Ri Ch'ŏlmyŏng

Ri Chol-myong (Korean: 리철명, born 18 February 1988) is a North Korean international football player. He plays for Pyongyang City in the DPR Korea League.

== International career ==
He has played on 44 occasions for the North Korean national team, scoring a goal in the 2010 AFC Challenge Cup against Kyrgyzstan. He has been called up to their 23-man squad for the 2010 FIFA World Cup.

Ri Chol-myong was a part of the squad in the 2010 Asian Games. Korea DRR lost 8–9 in a penalty shoot-out in the hands of UAE in the quarter-finals. Korea DPR lost because of the penalty Ri missed.

== International goals ==
#	Date	Venue	Opponent	Score	Result	Competition
1	19 February 2010	Sugathadasa Stadium, Colombo, Sri Lanka	Kyrgyzstan	4-0	4–0	2010 AFC Challenge Cup
2	10 November 2010	Aden, Yemen	Yemen	1-1	Draw	Friendly
3	24 December 2010	6th of October City, Egypt	Kuwait	1-2	1–2	Friendly
4	13 March 2012	Dasarath Rangasala Stadium, Kathmandu, Nepal	India	4-0	4–0	2012 AFC Challenge Cup
5	13 November 2014	Taipei Municipal Stadium, Taipei, Taiwan	Hong Kong	1–0	2–1	2015 EAFF East Asian Cup
