= Pak Song-chol (footballer, born 1987) =

North Korean footballer

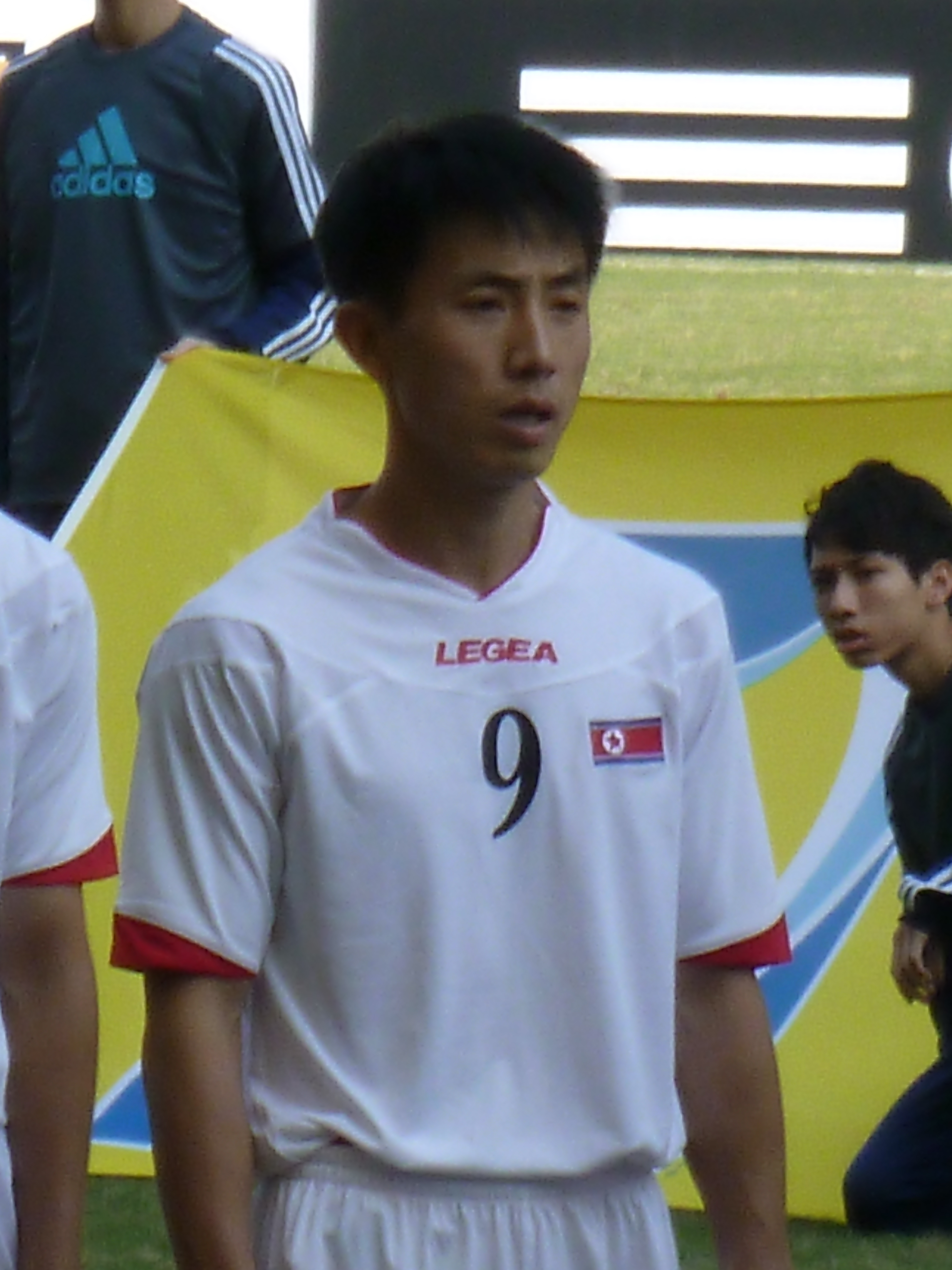
- Pak with North Korea in 2012

Personal information
- Full name: Pak Song-chol
- Date of birth: September 24, 1987 (age 39)
- Place of birth: Pyongyang, North Korea
- Height: 1.70 m (5 ft 7 in)
- Position: Midfielder

Team information
- Current team: Visakha
- Number: 9

Senior career*
Years	Team	Apps	(Gls)
2007–2017	Rimyongsu		
2018–2019	Visakha	9	(1)

International career^{‡}
2007–2017	North Korea	55	(12)
- * Club domestic league appearances and goals as of 8 September 2014 ‡ National team caps and goals as of 16 December 2017

- Pak Song-chol
- Hangul: 박성철
- Hanja: 朴成哲
- RR: Bak Seongcheol
- MR: Pak Sŏngch'ŏl

Pak Song-chol (Korean: 박성철; born 24 September 1987) is a North Korean professional footballer who plays for Visakha.

Pak has appeared for the Korea DPR national football team in the 2010 FIFA World Cup rounds. He also played at the 2007 FIFA U-20 World Cup.

== Career statistics ==
=== International ===
North Korea football team
Year	Apps	Goals
2007	2	0
2008	6	6
2009	1	0
2010	6	2
2011	7	0
2012	9	2
2013	0	0
2014	5	1
2015	3	0
Total	39	11

Statistics accurate as of match played on 18 January 2015

=== Goals for senior national team ===
#	Date	Venue	Opponent	Score	Result	Competition
1	31 July 2008	Hyderabad, India	Sri Lanka	2–0	3–0	2008 AFC Challenge Cup
2	31 July 2008	Hyderabad, India	Sri Lanka	3–0	3–0	2008 AFC Challenge Cup
3	2 August 2008	Hyderabad, India	Nepal	1–0	1–0	2008 AFC Challenge Cup
4	13 August 2008	New Delhi, India	Myanmar	1–0	4–0	2008 AFC Challenge Cup
5	13 August 2008	New Delhi, India	Myanmar	2–0	4–0	2008 AFC Challenge Cup
6	13 August 2008	New Delhi, India	Myanmar	3–0	4–0	2008 AFC Challenge Cup
7	19 February 2010	Colombo, Sri Lanka	Kyrgyzstan	1–0	4–0	2010 AFC Challenge Cup
8	24 February 2010	Colombo, Sri Lanka	Myanmar	3–0	5–0	2010 AFC Challenge Cup
9	1 December 2012	Hong Kong	Chinese Taipei	0–2	1–6	2013 EAFF East Asian Cup
10	9 December 2012	Hong Kong	Hong Kong	0–4	0–4	2013 EAFF East Asian Cup
11	2 November 2014	Manama	Bahrain	2–2	2–2	Friendly
