= Guwanç Rejepow =

Turkmen footballer

Personal information
- Full name: Guwanç Rejepow
- Date of birth: 20 April 1982 (age 44)
- Place of birth: Turkmen SSR
- Height: 1.72 m (5 ft 7 1/2 in)
- Position: Defender

Team information
- Current team: Hazyna

Senior career*
Years	Team	Apps	(Gls)
2002	Nebitçi Balkanabat		
2003–2005	Aşgabat		
2006	Nisa Aşgabat		
2007	HTTU		
2010	Talyp Sporty		
2011–2014	HTTU		
2015–	Hazyna		

International career^{‡}
2004–2012	Turkmenistan	20	(0)
- * Club domestic league appearances and goals as of 26 November 2015 ‡ National team caps and goals as of 26 November 2015

Guwanç Rejepow (Russian: Гуванч Реджепов; born on April 20, 1982) is a Turkmen footballer (defender).

Rejepow was part of the squad for the Turkmenistan national football team in the 2012 AFC Challenge Cup qualifying round, participating in the match against India on 25 March 2011.
