= 2012 Nehru Cup group stage =

== Table ==
Team	Pld	W	D	L	GF	GA	GD	Pts
Cameroon	4	3	1	0	11	3	+8	10
India	4	2	1	1	5	2	+3	7
Maldives	4	2	0	2	5	8	−3	6
Syria	4	1	1	2	6	6	0	4
Nepal	4	0	1	3	1	9	−8	1

Source: GSA

== India vs Syria ==
22 August 2012
19:00 IST

India	2 – 1	Syria
S. Chhetri 45+2'; Pereira 82'	Report	Al Shbli 89'

Nehru Stadium, Delhi
Referee: Vladislav Tseytlin (Uzbekistan)

INDIA:
GK	1	Subrata Pal	(yellow card) 69'
DF	2	Raju Gaikwad
DF	3	Nirmal Chettri	(yellow card) 73'
DF	39	Gouramangi Singh
MF	30	Francis Fernandes
MF	24	Lenny Rodrigues
MF	14	Mehtab Hossain
MF	17	Clifford Miranda
MF	15	Sanju Pradhan		(substituted off) 70'
MF	25	Syed Rahim Nabi
FW	11	Sunil Chhetri (c)
Substitutions:
MF	23	Anthony Pereira		(substituted on) 70'
Manager:
(Netherlands) Wim Koevermans

SYRIA:
GK	?	Taha Mosa
DF	3	Mohamad Zbida
DF	4	Jehad Al Baour	(yellow card) 59'
DF	2	Ahmad Al Salih
MF	8	Mohamad Afa Al Rifai		(substituted off) 46'
MF	15	Alaa Al Shbli
MF	?	Zaher Al Midani
MF	?	Oday Jafal	(yellow card) 77'
MF	18	Ali Ghalioum
FW	9	Mardik Mardikian	(yellow card) 30'	(substituted off) 64'
FW	20	Hani Al Taiar
Substitutions:
MF	?	Zakaria Al Omari		(substituted on) 46'
DF	?	Hamoud Al Hamoud		(substituted on) 64'
Manager:
Marwan Khouri

== Maldives vs Nepal ==
23 August 2012
19:00 IST

Maldives	2 – 1	Nepal
Assadhulla 6'; Easa 77'	Report	Rai 90+4'

Nehru Stadium, Delhi
Referee: Santosh Kumar (India)

MALDIVES:
GK	25	Imran Mohamed
DF	3	Mohamed Shifan
DF	13	Akram Abdul Ghanee
DF	17	Shafiu Ahmed
DF	19	Mohamed Rasheed
DF	8	Rilwan Waheed
MF	6	Mohamed Arif
FW	4	Mohammad Umair	(yellow card) 28'	(substituted off) 73'
FW	10	Ashad Ali
FW	14	Assadhulla Abdulla		(substituted off) 63'
FW	7	Ali Ashfaq (c)		(substituted off) 89'
Substitutions:
MF	12	Ahmed Rasheed		(substituted on) 63'
MF	15	Ismail Easa		(substituted on) 73'
MF	9	Imaaz Ahmed		(substituted on) 89'
Manager:
(Hungary) István Urbányi

NEPAL:
GK	1	Ritesh Thapa	(yellow card) 7'
DF	3	Biraj Maharjan
DF	5	Bikash Singh Chhetri
DF	19	Sagar Thapa (c)
DF	13	Sandip Rai
DF	32	Rohit Chand
MF	15	Raju Tamang		(substituted off) 38'
MF	7	Bijaya Gurung		(substituted off) 51'
MF	17	Bhola Silwal		(substituted off) 77'
FW	9	Santosh Sahukhala
FW	21	Bharat Khawas
Substitutions:
MF	9	Rupesh KC		(substituted on) 38'
MF	8	Jagjit Shrestha		(substituted on) 51'
FW	11	Ju Manu Rai		(substituted on) 77'
Manager:
(Nepal) Krishna Thapa

== Syria vs Cameroon ==
24 August 2012
19:00 IST

Syria	2 – 2	Cameroon
Al Shbli 42'; Jafal 80'	Report	Mpondo 17'; Ebanga 55' (pen.)

Nehru Stadium, Delhi
Referee: Rowan Arumughan (India)

SYRIA:
GK	1	Mosab Balhous (c)
DF	3	Mohamad Zbida
DF	4	Jehad Al Baour
DF	2	Ahmad Al Salih	(yellow card) 15'
DF	27	Yasser Shoshara
MF	7	Abd Al Kader Mjarmesh		(substituted off) 80'
MF	?	Zakaria Al Omari
MF	15	Alaa Al Shbli
MF	?	Oday Jafal
MF	18	Ali Ghalioum	(yellow card) 60'
FW	9	Mardik Mardikian		(substituted off) 58'
Substitutions:
FW	20	Hani Al Taiar		(substituted on) 58'
DF	?	Hamoud Al Hamoud		(substituted on) 80'
Manager:
Marwan Khouri

CAMEROON:
GK	16	Lawrence Ngome Ngoe
DF	14	Jean-Patrick Abouna
DF	15	Stéphane Meyoupo
DF	12	Paul Rolland Bebey Kingué (c)
DF	2	Joseph Julien Momasso		(substituted off) 62'
MF	17	Stéphane Kingue Mpondo	(yellow card) 29'	(substituted off) 76'
MF	13	Thierry Makon Nloga
MF	4	Gustave Moundi Djengue
FW	11	Ousmaïla Baba		(substituted off) 64'
FW	19	Mérimée Kologni
FW	8	Alix Bertin	(yellow card) 90+4'
Substitutions:
FW	9	Charles Edoa		(substituted on) 62'
LM	7	Ashu Tambe		(substituted on) 64'
FW	6	Talla Nembot		(substituted on) 76'
Manager:
(Cameroon) Emmanuel Bosso

== India vs Maldives ==
25 August 2012
19:00 IST

India	3 – 0	Maldives
S. Chhetri 45+2' (pen.), 70'; Nabi 54'	Report

Nehru Stadium, Delhi
Referee: Hamad Hashmi (United Arab Emirates)

INDIA:
GK	1	Subrata Pal
DF	2	Raju Gaikwad
DF	3	Nirmal Chettri		(substituted off) 90'
DF	39	Gouramangi Singh
MF	30	Francis Fernandes
MF	24	Lenny Rodrigues
MF	14	Mehtab Hossain
MF	17	Clifford Miranda		(substituted off) 77'
MF	15	Sanju Pradhan		(substituted off) 46'
MF	25	Syed Rahim Nabi
FW	11	Sunil Chhetri (c)
Substitutions:
FW	9	Robin Singh		(substituted on) 46'
MF	23	Anthony Pereira		(substituted on) 77'
DF	12	Denzil Franco	(yellow card) 90+1'	(substituted on) 90'
Manager:
(Netherlands) Wim Koevermans

MALDIVES:
GK	25	Imran Mohamed
DF	3	Mohamed Shifan
DF	13	Akram Abdul Ghanee
DF	17	Shafiu Ahmed
DF	8	Rilwan Waheed
MF	19	Mohamed Rasheed
MF	6	Mohamed Arif
MF	4	Mohammad Umair
FW	10	Ashad Ali	(yellow card) 11'
FW	14	Assadhulla Abdulla		(substituted off) 63'
FW	7	Ali Ashfaq (c)
Substitutions:
MF	15	Ismail Easa		(substituted on) 63'
Manager:
(Hungary) István Urbányi

== Nepal vs Cameroon ==
26 August 2012
19:00 IST

Nepal	0 – 5	Cameroon
	Report	Kolony 12', 60'; Ebanga 41', 65'; Momasso 76'

Nehru Stadium, Delhi
Referee: Rowan Arumughan (India)

NEPAL:
GK	1	Ritesh Thapa	(substituted off) 67'
DF	3	Biraj Maharjan
DF	5	Bikash Singh Chhetri
DF	19	Sagar Thapa (c)
DF	13	Sandip Rai
DF	32	Rohit Chand
MF	9	Rupesh KC	(substituted off) 61'
MF	8	Nirajan Khadka	(substituted off) 51'
FW	21	Bharat Khawas
FW	12	Sujal Shrestha
FW	11	Ju Manu Rai
Substitutions:
FW	10	Anil Gurung	(substituted on) 31'
MF	17	Bhola Silwal	(substituted on) 61'
GK	?	Bikesh Kuthu	(substituted on) 67'
Manager:
(Nepal) Krishna Thapa

CAMEROON:
GK	16	Lawrence Ngome Ngoe
DF	14	Jean-Patrick Abouna
DF	15	Stéphane Meyoupo
DF	12	Paul Rolland Bebey Kingué (c)
DF	2	Joseph Julien Momasso
MF	4	Gustave Moundi Djengue
MF	17	Stéphane Kingue Mpondo	(substituted off) 71'
MF	13	Thierry Makon Nloga
LM	7	Ashu Tambe	(substituted off) 65'
FW	19	Mérimée Kologni
FW	8	Alix Bertin	(substituted off) 74'
Substitutions:
FW	9	Charles Edoa	(substituted on) 65'
DF	20	Patrick Ntolla	(substituted on) 71'
FW	6	Talla Nembot	(substituted on) 74'
Manager:
(Cameroon) Emmanuel Bosso

== Maldives vs Syria ==
27 August 2012
19:00 IST

Maldives	2 – 1	Syria
Ashfaq 59'; Rasheed 90+3'	Report	Al Shbli 81'

Nehru Stadium, Delhi
Referee: Santosh Kumar (India)

MALDIVES:
GK	25	Imran Mohamed
DF	3	Mohamed Shifan
DF	13	Akram Abdul Ghanee
DF	17	Shafiu Ahmed
DF	19	Mohamed Rasheed
MF	15	Ismail Easa	(substituted off) 78'
MF	6	Mohamed Arif
FW	4	Mohammad Umair
FW	10	Ashad Ali
FW	14	Assadhulla Abdulla	(substituted off) 72'
FW	7	Ali Ashfaq (c)
Substitutions:
FW	12	Ahmed Rasheed	(substituted on) 72'
FW	21	Hassan Adhuham	(substituted on) 78'
Manager:
(Hungary) István Urbányi

SYRIA:
GK	1	Mosab Balhous (c)
DF	27	Yasser Shoshara
DF	4	Jehad Al Baour	(yellow card) 29'
DF	2	Ahmad Al Salih	(yellow card) 14'
MF	8	Mohamad Afa Al Rifai		(substituted off) 46'
MF	15	Alaa Al Shbli
MF	?	Zaher Al Midani
MF	?	Oday Jafal	(yellow card) 64'
MF	7	Abd Al Kader Mjarmesh		(substituted off) 62'
MF	18	Ali Ghalioum		(substituted off) 46'
FW	20	Hani Al Taiar
Substitutions:
FW	9	Mardik Mardikian		(substituted on) 46'
MF	?	Zakaria Al Omari		(substituted on) 62'
DF	3	Mohamad Zbida		(substituted on) 79'
Manager:
Marwan Khouri

== India vs Nepal ==
28 August 2012
19:00 IST

India	0 – 0	Nepal
	Report

Nehru Stadium, Delhi
Referee: Vladislav Tseytlin (Uzbekistan)

INDIA:
GK	1	Subrata Pal
DF	2	Raju Gaikwad
DF	12	Denzil Franco
DF	39	Gouramangi Singh
MF	30	Francis Fernandes
MF	24	Lenny Rodrigues	(substituted off) 77'
MF	14	Mehtab Hossain
MF	15	Clifford Miranda	(substituted off) 46'
MF	23	Anthony Pereira
MF	25	Syed Rahim Nabi
FW	11	Sunil Chhetri (c)
Substitutions:
FW	9	Robin Singh	(substituted on) 46'
MF	23	Jewel Raja	(substituted on) 77'
Manager:
(Netherlands) Wim Koevermans

NEPAL:
GK	16	Kiran Chemjong
DF	3	Biraj Maharjan	(yellow card) 62'
DF	5	Bikash Singh Chhetri	(red card) 90'
DF	19	Sagar Thapa (c)
DF	13	Sandip Rai	(yellow card) 45'
DF	32	Rohit Chand	(yellow card) 84'
MF	8	Jagjit Shrestha
MF	15	Raju Tamang
MF	17	Bhola Silwal		(substituted off) 90+1'
FW	11	Ju Manu Rai		(substituted off) 88'
FW	21	Bharat Khawas
Substitutions:
FW	9	Santosh Sahukhala		(substituted on) 88'
FW	10	Anil Gurung		(substituted on) 90+1'
Manager:
(Nepal) Krishna Thapa

== Cameroon vs Maldives ==
29 August 2012
19:00 IST

Cameroon	3 – 1	Maldives
Mpondo 12', 39'; Ebanga 50' (pen.)	Report	Akram Abdul Ghanee 26'

Nehru Stadium, Delhi
Referee: Hamad Hashmi (United Arab Emirates)

CAMEROON:
GK	16	Lawrence Ngome Ngoe
DF	14	Jean-Patrick Abouna
DF	15	Stéphane Meyoupo
DF	12	Paul Rolland Bebey Kingué (c)
DF	2	Joseph Julien Momasso	(yellow card) 73'
MF	4	Gustave Moundi Djengue	(yellow card) 56'
MF	17	Stéphane Kingue Mpondo
MF	13	Thierry Makon Nloga
LM	7	Ashu Tambe
FW	19	Mérimée Kologni		(substituted off) 61'
FW	8	Alix Bertin		(substituted off) 78'
Substitutions:
FW	9	Charles Edoa		(substituted on) 61'
FW	10	Bitte Samuel		(substituted on) 78'
Manager:
(Cameroon) Emmanuel Bosso

MALDIVES:
GK	25	Imran Mohamed
DF	3	Mohamed Shifan
DF	13	Akram Abdul Ghanee	(yellow card) 74'
DF	17	Shafiu Ahmed
DF	8	Rilwan Waheed		(substituted off) 87'
MF	19	Mohamed Rasheed
MF	4	Mohammad Umair
MF	15	Ismail Easa		(substituted off) 46'
FW	10	Ashad Ali	(red card) 47'
FW	14	Assadhulla Abdulla		(substituted off) 80'
FW	7	Ali Ashfaq (c)
Substitutions:
FW	21	Hassan Adhuham		(substituted on) 46'
MF	23	Moosa Yaamin		(substituted on) 80'
MF	32	Mohamed Hussain Niyaz		(substituted on) 87'
Manager:
(Hungary) István Urbányi

== Syria vs Nepal ==
30 August 2012
19:00 IST

Syria	2 – 0	Nepal
Hani Al Taiar 9'; Ali Ghalioum 49'	Report

Nehru Stadium, Delhi
Referee: Rowan Arumughan (India)

SYRIA:
GK	1	Mosab Balhous (c)
DF	3	Mohamad Zbida	(substituted off) 90+2'
DF	27	Yasser Shoshara
DF	?	Khaled Al Brijawi
MF	8	Mohamad Afa Al Rifai	(substituted off) 81'
MF	15	Alaa Al Shbli
MF	?	Zaher Al Midani
MF	18	Ali Ghalioum
MF	7	Abd Al Kader Mjarmesh	(substituted off) 79'
FW	9	Mardik Mardikian
FW	20	Hani Al Taiar
Substitutions:
MF	?	Zakaria Al Omari	(substituted on) 79'
DF	?	Hamzeh Al Aitoni	(substituted on) 81'
DF	?	Hamoud Al Hamoud	(substituted on) 90+2'
Manager:
Marwan Khouri

NEPAL:
GK	16	Kiran Chemjong
DF	5	Sabindra Shrestha		(substituted off) 29'
DF	3	Biraj Maharjan
DF	19	Sagar Thapa (c)
DF	13	Sandip Rai
DF	32	Rohit Chand
MF	8	Jagjit Shrestha
MF	15	Raju Tamang
MF	17	Bhola Silwal
FW	11	Ju Manu Rai		(substituted off) 46'
FW	21	Bharat Khawas		(substituted off) 77'
Substitutions:
FW	12	Sujal Shrestha	(yellow card) 85'	(substituted on) 29'
FW	10	Anil Gurung		(substituted on) 46'
FW	9	Santosh Sahukhala	(yellow card) 86'	(substituted on) 77'
Manager:
(Nepal) Krishna Thapa

== India vs Cameroon ==
31 August 2012
19:00 IST

India	0 – 1	Cameroon
	Report	Bite 2'

Nehru Stadium, Delhi
Referee: Hamad Hashmi (United Arab Emirates)
