= 2012 Nehru Cup squads =

The following was a list of squads for each nation competing the 2012 Nehru Cup in New Delhi, India. The tournament began on 23 August.

== Squads ==
=== India ===
Coach: (Netherlands) Wim Koevermans

| No. | Pos. | Player | Date of birth (age) | Caps | Goals | Club |
|---|---|---|---|---|---|---|
| | GK | Subrata Pal | 24 November 1986 (age 38) | 43 | 0 | (All India Football Federation) Prayag United |
| | GK | Karanjit Singh | 8 January 1986 (age 39) | 12 | 0 | (All India Football Federation) Salgaocar |
| | GK | Subhasish Roy Chowdhury | 27 September 1985 (age 40) | 4 | 0 | (All India Football Federation) Dempo |
| | DF | Gouramangi Singh | 25 January 1986 (age 39) | 56 | 5 | (All India Football Federation) Prayag United |
| | DF | Syed Rahim Nabi | 14 December 1985 (age 39) | 47 | 4 | (All India Football Federation) Mohun Bagan |
| | DF | Raju Gaikwad | 25 September 1990 (age 35) | 11 | 0 | (All India Football Federation) East Bengal |
| | DF | Nirmal Chettri | 21 October 1990 (age 34) | 4 | 0 | (All India Football Federation) Mohun Bagan |
| | DF | Denzil Franco | 30 June 1986 (age 39) | 2 | 0 | (All India Football Federation) Churchill Brothers |
| | DF | Gurwinder Singh | 16 July 1986 (age 39) | 0 | 0 | (All India Football Federation) East Bengal |
| | MF | Clifford Miranda | 11 July 1982 (age 43) | 30 | 8 | (All India Football Federation) Dempo |
| | MF | Anthony Pereira | 9 April 1982 (age 43) | 23 | 2 | (All India Football Federation) Dempo |
| | MF | Jewel Raja | 19 January 1990 (age 35) | 14 | 1 | (All India Football Federation) Mohun Bagan |
| | MF | Mehtab Hossain | 5 September 1985 (age 40) | 12 | 2 | (All India Football Federation) East Bengal |
| | MF | Francis Fernandes | 25 November 1985 (age 39) | 5 | 0 | (All India Football Federation) Salgaocar |
| | MF | Lenny Rodrigues | 10 May 1987 (age 38) | 2 | 0 | (All India Football Federation) Churchill Brothers |
| | MF | Alwyn George | 1 March 1992 (age 33) | 0 | 0 | (All India Football Federation) Pailan Arrows |
| | MF | Sanju Pradhan | 15 August 1989 (age 36) | 0 | 0 | (All India Football Federation) East Bengal |
| | FW | Sunil Chhetri (c) | 3 August 1984 (age 41) | 58 | 33 | (Portuguese Football Federation) Sporting B |
| | FW | Manandeep Singh | 3 November 1992 (age 32) | 1 | 0 | (All India Football Federation) East Bengal |
| | FW | Robin Singh | 9 May 1990 (age 35) | 0 | 0 | (All India Football Federation) East Bengal |

=== Cameroon ===
Coach: (France) Paul Le Guen

| No. | Pos. | Player | Date of birth (age) | Caps | Club |
|---|---|---|---|---|---|
| 1 | GK | Carlos Kameni | 18 February 1984 (aged 26) | 58 | (Spain) Espanyol |
| 2 | DF | Benoît Assou-Ekotto | 24 March 1984 (aged 26) | 4 | (England) Tottenham Hotspur |
| 3 | DF | Nicolas N'Koulou | 27 March 1990 (aged 20) | 6 | (France) AS Monaco |
| 4 | DF | Rigobert Song | 1 July 1976 (aged 33) | 133 | (Turkey) Trabzonspor |
| 5 | DF | Sébastien Bassong | 9 July 1986 (aged 23) | 3 | (England) Tottenham Hotspur |
| 6 | MF | Alex Song | 9 September 1987 (aged 22) | 20 | (England) Arsenal |
| 7 | FW | Bitte Samuel | 28 November 1985 (aged 24) | 17 | (Cameroon) Sable FC |
| 8 | DF | Geremi | 20 December 1978 (aged 31) | 109 | (Turkey) Ankaragücü |
| 9 | FW | Samuel Eto'o (c) | 10 March 1981 (aged 29) | 92 | (Italy) Internazionale |
| 10 | MF | Achille Emana | 5 June 1982 (aged 28) | 32 | (Spain) Real Betis |
| 11 | MF | Jean Makoun | 29 May 1983 (aged 27) | 46 | (France) Lyon |
| 12 | MF | Thierry Makon Nloga | 25 April 1988 (aged 22) | 0 | (Cameroon) New Star de Douala |
| 13 | FW | Eric Choupo-Moting | 23 March 1989 (aged 21) | 0 | (Germany) 1. FC Nürnberg |
| 14 | DF | Aurélien Chedjou | 20 June 1985 (aged 24) | 8 | (France) Lille |
| 15 | FW | Pierre Webó | 20 January 1982 (aged 28) | 39 | (Spain) Mallorca |
| 16 | FW | Vigny Mérimée Kolony Ngampiep | 27 November 1991 (aged 18) | 40 | (Cameroon) Panthère du Ndé |
| 17 | FW | Mohammadou Idrissou | 8 March 1980 (aged 30) | 28 | (Germany) SC Freiburg |
| 18 | MF | Alix Bertin Ondobo Ebanga | 23 March 1986 (aged 24) | 12 | (Cameroon) Unisport Bafang |
| 19 | DF | Stéphane Mbia | 20 May 1986 (aged 24) | 29 | (France) Marseille |
| 20 | MF | Joseph Julien Momasso | 9 December 1988 (aged 21) | 4 | (Cameroon) Astres |
| 21 | MF | Joël Matip | 8 August 1991 (aged 18) | 1 | (Germany) Schalke 04 |
| 22 | MF | Stéphane Kingue Mpondo | 28 February 1986 (aged 24) | 0 | (Cameroon) AS Lausanne de Yaoundé |
| 23 | FW | Vincent Aboubakar | 22 January 1992 (aged 18) | 0 | (Cameroon) Cotonsport Garoua |

=== Nepal ===
Coach: Krishna Thapa

| No. | Pos. | Player | Date of birth (age) | Caps | Goals | Club |
|---|---|---|---|---|---|---|
| | GK | Kiran Chemjong | 20 March 1990 (aged 22) | 11 | 0 | (All Nepal Football Association) Three Star |
| | GK | Ritesh Thapa | 10 October 1984 (aged 27) | 2 | 0 | (All Nepal Football Association) Nepal Police |
| | GK | Bikesh Kuthu | Unknown | 0 | 0 | (All Nepal Football Association) Iceberg Madhyapur |
| | DF | Sabindra Shrestha | 5 January 1992 (aged 20) | 1 | 0 | (All Nepal Football Association) Manang Marshyangdi |
| | DF | Bikash Singh Chhetri | 19 February 1992 (aged 20) | 3 | 0 | (All Nepal Football Association) Manang Marshyangdi |
| | DF | Biraj Maharjan | 1 January 1990 (aged 22) | 14 | 0 | (All Nepal Football Association) Three Star |
| | DF | Sandip Rai | 14 April 1989 (aged 23) | 13 | 0 | (All Nepal Football Association) Manang Marshyangdi |
| | DF | Sagar Thapa | 19 January 1984 (aged 28) | 14 | 1 | (All Nepal Football Association) New Road |
| | DF | Rohit Chand | 1 March 1992 (aged 20) | 13 | 0 | Unattached |
| | MF | Anil Ojha | Unknown | 0 | 0 | (All Nepal Football Association) Three Star |
| | MF | Bhola Silwal | 4 January 1987 (aged 25) | 10 | 1 | (All Nepal Football Association) Nepal Police |
| | MF | Raju Tamang | 27 October 1985 (aged 26) | 9 | 0 | (All Nepal Football Association) Nepal Army |
| | MF | Rupesh KC | 1 August 1984 (aged 28) | 0 | 0 | (All Nepal Football Association) Himalayan Sherpa |
| | MF | Nirajan Khadka | 20 December 1988 (aged 23) | 10 | 0 | (All Nepal Football Association) Manang Marshyangdi |
| | MF | Bijaya Gurung | 11 November 1985 (aged 26) | 7 | 0 | Unattached |
| | MF | Jagjit Shrestha | 10 August 1992 (aged 20) | 4 | 1 | (All Nepal Football Association) Himalayan Sherpa |
| | FW | Anil Gurung | 23 September 1988 (aged 23) | 19 | 7 | (All Nepal Football Association) Manang Marshyangdi |
| | FW | Sujal Shrestha | 4 February 1993 (aged 19) | 3 | 0 | (All Nepal Football Association) Manang Marshyangdi |
| | FW | Santosh Sahukhala | 10 January 1988 (aged 24) | 15 | 2 | (All Nepal Football Association) Manang Marshyangdi |
| | FW | Ju Manu Rai | 1 March 1983 (aged 29) | 29 | 9 | (All Nepal Football Association) Nepal Police |
| | FW | Bharat Khawas | 16 April 1992 (aged 20) | 13 | 3 | (All Nepal Football Association) Nepal Police |

=== Maldives ===
Coach: (Hungary) István Urbányi

| No. | Pos. | Player | Date of birth (age) | Caps | Goals | Club |
|---|---|---|---|---|---|---|
| | GK | Mohamed Imran | 7 June 1986 (age 39) | | 0 | (Football Association of Maldives) Maziya S&RC |
| | GK | Imran Mohamed | 18 December 1980 (age 44) | | 0 | (Football Association of Maldives) New Radiant SC |
| | DF | Rilwan Waheed | 14 February 1991 (age 34) | 4 | 0 | (Football Association of Maldives) Victory SC |
| | DF | Mohamed Shifan | 8 March 1983 (age 42) | | 1 | (Football Association of Maldives) Victory SC |
| | DF | Shafiu Ahmed | 13 November 1979 (age 45) | | 0 | (Football Association of Maldives) Club Valencia |
| | DF | Akram Abdul Ghanee | 19 April 1987 (age 38) | | 0 | (Football Association of Maldives) VB Sports Club |
| | DF | Faruhad Ismail | 7 May 1990 (age 35) | | 0 | (Football Association of Maldives) VB Sports Club |
| | DF | Ahmed Abdulla | 11 March 1987 (age 38) | | 0 | (Football Association of Maldives) New Radiant SC |
| | MF | Mohammad Umair | 3 July 1998 (age 27) | | | (Football Association of Maldives) VB Sports Club |
| | MF | Mohamed Arif | 11 August 1985 (age 40) | | 1 | (Football Association of Maldives) VB Sports Club |
| | MF | Mohamed Hussain Niyaz | 19 March 1987 (age 38) | | 0 | (Football Association of Maldives) Victory SC |
| | MF | Ahmed Imaaz | 12 April 1992 (age 33) | 0 | 0 | (Football Association of Maldives) Club Eagles |
| 23 | MF | Moosa Yaamin | 10 July 1985 (age 40) | | 0 | (Football Association of Maldives) Maziya S&RC |
| | MF | Ahmed Rasheed | 5 September 1983 (age 42) | | 0 | (Football Association of Maldives) Maziya S&RC |
| | MF | Mohamed Saeed | Not known | | 0 | (Football Association of Maldives) New Radiant SC |
| | FW | Mohamed Rasheed | 6 October 1986 (age 39) | 4 | 1 | (Football Association of Maldives) Victory SC |
| | FW | Hassan Adhuham | 8 January 1990 (age 35) | | 1 | (Football Association of Maldives) Victory SC |
| | FW | Ali Ashfaq | 5 September 1986 (age 39) | | 23 | (Football Association of Maldives) New Radiant SC |
| | FW | Ashad Ali | 14 September 1986 (age 39) | | | (Football Association of Maldives) VB Sports Club |
| | FW | Ismail Easa | 7 November 1991 (age 33) | 0 | 0 | (Football Association of Maldives) Maziya S&RC |

=== Syria ===
Coach: Marwan Khouri

| No. | Pos. | Player | Date of birth (age) | Caps | Goals | Club |
|---|---|---|---|---|---|---|
| | GK | Mosab Balhous | 5 October 1983 (age 42) | 75 | 0 | (Syria) Al-Wahda |
| | GK | Taha Mosa | 30 May 1987 (age 38) | 0 | 0 | (Syria) Al-Jaish |
| | GK | Mahmoud Al Youssef | 20 January 1988 (age 37) | 0 | 0 | (Syria) Hutteen |
| | DF | Bakri Tarab | 20 January 1985 (age 40) | 33 | 0 | Unattached |
| | DF | Ahmad Al Salih | 20 May 1989 (age 36) | 3 | 0 | (Syria) Al-Jaish |
| | DF | Hamzeh Al Aitoni | 16 January 1986 (age 39) | 10 | 0 | Unattached |
| | DF | Jehad Al Baour | 27 June 1987 (age 38) | 1 | 0 | (Syria) Al-Jaish |
| | DF | Mohamad Zbida | 20 May 1990 (age 35) | 3 | 0 | (Syria) Al-Jaish |
| | DF | Hamoud Al Hamoud | 1 January 1984 (age 41) | 0 | 0 | (Syria) Al-Shorta |
| | DF | Khaled Al Brijawi | 8 July 1990 (age 35) | 0 | 0 | (Syria) Al-Majd |
| | DF | Yasser Shoshara | 11 April 1988 (age 37) | 0 | 0 | (Syria) Al-Wahda |
| | MF | Alaa Al Shbli | 3 May 1989 (age 36) | 4 | 0 | (Syria) Al-Karamah |
| | MF | Zaher Midani | 13 April 1989 (age 36) | 3 | 0 | (Syria) Al-Shorta |
| | MF | Oday Jafal | 27 May 1988 (age 37) | 4 | 1 | (Syria) Al-Shorta |
| | MF | Abd Al Kader Mjarmesh | 25 June 1988 (age 37) | 0 | 0 | Unattached |
| | MF | Zakaria Al Omari | 1 November 1990 (age 34) | 0 | 0 | (Syria) Al-Ittihad |
| | MF | Ali Ghalioum | 1 January 1987 (age 38) | 0 | 0 | (Syria) Al-Shorta |
| | MF | Mohamad Afa Al Rifai | 6 April 1988 (age 37) | 0 | 0 | (Syria) Al-Jaish |
| | FW | Mardik Mardikian | 14 March 1992 (age 33) | 0 | 0 | (Bahrain Football Association) Al-Riffa |
| | FW | Hani Al Taiar | 1 May 1988 (age 37) | 3 | 0 | (Syria) Al-Karamah |

== Player Representation ==
=== By Club ===
| Players | Clubs |
|---|---|
| 7 | (Nepal) Manang Marshyangdi |
| 6 | (India) East Bengal |
| 5 | (Syria) Al-Jaish |
| 4 | Nepal Police, (Syria) Al-Shorta |
| 3 | (India) Dempo, Mohun Bagan, (Nepal) Three Star |
| 2 | (India) Prayag United, Salgaocar, Churchill Brothers, (Nepal) Himalayan Sherpa, (Syria) Al-Wahda, Al-Karamah |
| 1 | (India) Pailan Arrows, Sporting Clube de Portugal B, Nepal Army, New Road, Iceberg Madhyapur, (Syria) Hutteen, Al-Majd, Al-Ittihad, (Bahrain) Riffa |

=== By Club Nationality ===
| Players | Clubs |
|---|---|
| 20 | (Maldives) Dhivehi League |
| 19 | (Nepal) Martyr's Memorial A-Division League |
| 19 | (India) I-League |
| 19 | (Cameroon) Elite One |
| 16 | (Syria) Syrian Premier League |
| 1 | (Bahrain) Bahraini Premier League |
| 1 | (Portugal) Liga de Honra |
