= 2011 SAFF Championship squads =

Below are the squads for the 2011 South Asian Football Federation Cup, hosted by India, which will take place between 2 and 11 December 2011. The player's total caps, their club teams and age are as of 2 December 2011 – the tournament's opening day.

== Group A ==
=== Afghanistan ===
Coach: (Afghanistan) Mohammad Yousef Kargar

No.	Pos.	Player	Date of birth (age)	Caps	Goals	Club
	GK	Hamidullah Yousafzai	9 October 1981 (aged 30)	7	0	(Afghanistan Football Federation) Ferozi
	GK	Bashir Darman	11 September 1989 (aged 22)	0	0	(Afghanistan Football Federation) Seramiasht
	DF	Djelaludin Sharityar	15 March 1983 (aged 28)	13	0	(Bahrain Football Association) Al Hidd Club
	DF	Zohib Islam Amiri	2 May 1987 (aged 24)	21	0	(All India Football Federation) Mumbai
	DF	Faisal Sakhizada	15 July 1990 (aged 21)	9	0	(Afghanistan Football Federation) Ordu
	DF	Muqadar Qazizadah	11 September 1988 (aged 23)	8	0	(Afghanistan Football Federation) Ferozi
	DF	Mujtaba Faiz	21 November 1989 (aged 22)	2	0	(Afghanistan Football Federation) Ferozi
	MF	Israfeel Kohistani	5 June 1987 (aged 24)	19	1	(Afghanistan Football Federation) Ferozi
	MF	Waheed Nadeem	2 June 1989 (aged 22)	7	1	(Afghanistan Football Federation) Ferozi
	MF	Mohammad Mashriqi	7 July 1987 (aged 24)	8	0	(United States Soccer Federation) Brishna F.C.
	MF	Ahmad Hatifi	13 March 1986 (aged 25)	0	0	Unattached
	MF	Sandjar Ahmadi	10 February 1992 (aged 19)	0	0	(German Football Association) SC Vier-und Marschlande
	MF	Masihullah Barakzai	6 December 1990 (aged 20)	9	0	(Afghanistan Football Federation) Ordu
	MF	Sayed Maqsood Hashemi	5 March 1986 (aged 25)	22	2	(Afghanistan Football Federation) Ordu
	MF	Ata Yamrali	5 July 1982 (aged 29)	8	2	(German Football Association) TSV Sasel
	MF	Mohammed Yousuf Sameh	11 April 1985 (aged 26)	2	0	(United States Soccer Federation) Bay Area Ambassadors
	MF	Ghulam Hazrat Niazi	30 November 1991 (aged 20)	3	0	(Afghanistan Football Federation) Ordu
	FW	Balal Arezou	28 December 1988 (aged 22)	2	1	(Norwegian Football Federation) Asker
	FW	Hashmatullah Barakzai	1 January 1980 (aged 31)	22	2	(Afghanistan Football Federation) Ferozi

=== India ===
Coach: (India) Savio Medeira

No.	Pos.	Player	Date of birth (age)	Caps	Goals	Club
21	GK	Subhasish Roy Chowdhury	24 December 1985 (aged 25)	2	0	(All India Football Federation) Dempo SC
1	GK	Karanjit Singh	3 January 1986 (aged 25)	2	0	(All India Football Federation) Salgaocar SC
30	GK	Gurpreet Singh Sandhu	3 February 1992 (aged 19)	1	0	(All India Football Federation) East Bengal
14	DF	Mahesh Gawli	23 January 1980 (aged 31)	56	1	(All India Football Federation) Dempo
19	DF	Gouramangi Singh	25 January 1986 (aged 25)	43	5	(All India Football Federation) Churchill Brothers
16	DF	Samir Subash Naik	8 August 1979 (aged 32)	34	0	(All India Football Federation) Dempo SC
2	DF	Moirangthem Govin Singh	15 June 1988 (aged 22)	4	0	(All India Football Federation) United Sikkim FC
4	DF	Nirmal Chettri	3 August 1990 (aged 21)	0	0	(All India Football Federation) East Bengal
22	DF	Syed Rahim Nabi	12 December 1985 (aged 26)	34	2	(All India Football Federation) Mohun Bagan A.C.
8	MF	Climax Lawrence	21 March 1979 (aged 31)	63	3	(All India Football Federation) Dempo SC
23	MF	Steven Dias	25 December 1983 (aged 28)	43	7	(All India Football Federation) Churchill Brothers
15	MF	Clifford Miranda	25 January 1982 (aged 29)	23	0	(All India Football Federation) Dempo
12	MF	Anthony Pereira	8 August 1982 (aged 28)	13	2	(All India Football Federation) Dempo
28	MF	Jewel Raja Shaikh	2 March 1990 (aged 20)	7	1	(All India Football Federation) Mohun Bagan A.C.
20	MF	Lalrindika Ralte	10 June 1992 (aged 19)	5	0	(All India Football Federation) Churchill Brothers
25	MF	Rocus Lamare	11 July 1986 (aged 25)	4	0	(All India Football Federation) Salgaocar SC
11	FW	Sunil Chhetri	8 March 1984 (aged 27)	49	26	(All India Football Federation) Mohun Bagan A.C.
18	FW	Sushil Kumar Singh	4 January 1989 (aged 22)	14	2	(All India Football Federation) United Sikkim FC
10	FW	Jeje Lalpekhlua	7 January 1991 (aged 20)	10	6	(All India Football Federation) Pune FC
9	FW	Joaquim Abranches	28 October 1985 (aged 26)	2	0	(All India Football Federation) Dempo

=== Sri Lanka ===
Coach: (Sri Lanka) Sampath Perera

No.	Pos.	Player	Date of birth (age)	Caps	Goals	Club
	GK	Sujan Perera	18 July 1992 (aged 19)	0	0	(Football Federation of Sri Lanka) Kalutara Park
	DF	Well Ruwanthilaka	27 September 1984 (aged 27)	30	3	(Football Federation of Sri Lanka) Saunders
	DF	Rathnayake Nawarathna Warakagoda	13 October 1986 (aged 24)	14	0	(Football Federation of Sri Lanka) Army
	DF	Chamira Krishantha	31 March 1989 (aged 22)	6	0	(Football Federation of Sri Lanka) Navy
	DF	Sanka Danushka	28 December 1984 (aged 26)	2	0	(Football Federation of Sri Lanka) Army
	DF	Thilina Suranda Bandara	16 August 1985 (aged 26)	15	0	(Football Federation of Sri Lanka) Don Bosco
	DF	Bandara Warakagoda	13 October 1986 (aged 24)	15	0	(Football Federation of Sri Lanka) Army
	MF	Chathura Gunaratne	8 September 1982 (aged 29)	31	6	(Football Federation of Sri Lanka) Renown
	MF	Kumara Lankesara	11 October 1986 (aged 24)	9	0	(Football Federation of Sri Lanka) Air Force
	MF	Tuwan Rizni	17 November 1990 (aged 20)	3	0	(Football Federation of Sri Lanka) Renown
	MF	Mohamed Zain	14 January 1989 (aged 22)	8	1	(Football Federation of Sri Lanka) Renown
	MF	Mohamed Izzadeen	1 January 1980 (aged 31)	30	5	(Football Federation of Sri Lanka) Army
	MF	Nagur Meera	20 June 1987 (aged 24)	4	0	(Football Federation of Sri Lanka) Java Lane
	FW	Pasqual Nadeeka Pushpakumara	11 March 1986 (aged 25)	15	0	(Football Federation of Sri Lanka) Police
	FW	Nipuna Bandara	17 June 1991 (aged 20)	2	0	(Football Federation of Sri Lanka) Don Bosco
	FW	Mohammed Shafraz	23 June 1989 (aged 22)	10	3	(Football Federation of Sri Lanka) Renown

=== Bhutan ===
Coach: (Japan) Hiroaki Matsuyama

No.	Pos.	Player	Date of birth (age)	Caps	Goals	Club
	GK	Hemlal Bhattrai	1 November 1993 (aged 17)	0	0	(Bhutan Football Federation) Zimdra
	DF	Sangay Khandu	8 February 1985 (aged 26)	20	0	(Bhutan Football Federation) Transport United
	DF	Pema Rinchen	14 April 1990 (aged 21)	14	0	(Bhutan Football Federation) Yeedzin
	DF	Man Bahadur Gurung	15 March 1993 (aged 18)	0	0	(Bhutan Football Federation) Druk Stars
	DF	Jigme Tshering Dorji	26 February 1995 (aged 16)	0	0	(Bhutan Football Federation) Zimdra
	DF	Chimi U. Dorji	1 September 1995 (aged 16)	0	0	(Bhutan Football Federation)
	MF	Sonam Tenzin	20 October 1986 (aged 24)	13	0	(All India Football Federation) Buddhist Blue Stars
	MF	Nawang Dhendup	20 October 1984 (aged 26)	25	2	(Bhutan Football Federation) Druk Stars
	MF	Nima Sangay	15 August 1984 (aged 27)	13	1	(Bhutan Football Federation) Drukpol
	MF	Karma Shedrup Tshering	9 April 1990 (aged 21)	3	0	(Bhutan Football Federation) Druk Stars
	MF	Thinley Dorji	5 May 1990 (aged 21)	2	0	(Bhutan Football Federation) Yeedzin
	MF	Tshering Dorji	11 September 1995 (aged 16)	0	0	(Bhutan Football Federation) Transport United
	MF	Yeshi Samdrup	6 May 1994 (aged 17)	0	0	(Bhutan Football Federation)
	MF	Tshering Dendup	6 August 1995 (aged 16)	0	0	(Bhutan Football Federation)
	MF	Chimi Dorji	22 December 1993 (aged 17)	8	0	(Bhutan Football Federation) Druk Stars
	FW	Chencho Gyeltshen	10 May 1996 (aged 15)	1	1	(Bhutan Football Federation) Yeedzin

== Group B ==
=== Bangladesh ===
Coach: (North Macedonia) Nikola Ilievski

No.	Pos.	Player	Date of birth (age)	Caps	Goals	Club
22	GK	Biplob Bhattacharjee	7 January 1981 (Age 30)	29	0	(Bangladesh Football Federation) Sheikh Russel KC
1	GK	Mamun Khan	20 December 1985 (Age 25)	5	0	(Bangladesh Football Federation) Muktijoddha Sangsad
23	GK	Shahidul Alam Sohel	1 May 1992 (Age 19)	0	0	(Bangladesh Football Federation) Abahani Limited Dhaka
2	DF	Nasirul Islam Nasir	5 October 1988 (Age 23)	15	0	(Bangladesh Football Federation) Mohammedan
3	DF	Rezaul Karim Reza	1 July 1987 (Age 24)	9	1	(Bangladesh Football Federation) Farashganj
14	DF	Mamun Miah	11 September 1987 (Age 24)	7	0	(Bangladesh Football Federation) Abahani Limited Dhaka
5	DF	Mohammed Ariful Islam	20 December 1987 (Age 23)	20	0	(Bangladesh Football Federation) Mohammedan
19	DF	Mohammed Sujan (Captain)	1 June 1982 (Age 29)	29	3	(Bangladesh Football Federation) Abahani Limited Dhaka
44	MF	Mohammed Mezbabul Haque Manik	18 July 1990 (Age 21)	2	0	(Bangladesh Football Federation) Sheikh Russel KC
6	MF	Atiqur Rahman Meshu	26 August 1988 (Age 23)	21	1	(Bangladesh Football Federation) Brothers Union
7	MF	Pranotosh Kumar Das	1 July 1982 (Age 29)	3	1	(Bangladesh Football Federation) Abahani Limited Dhaka
28	MF	Mamunul Islam Mamun	12 December 1988 (Age 22)	23	2	(Bangladesh Football Federation) Abahani Limited Dhaka
9	MF	Towhidul Alam Towhid	24 July 1992 (Age 21)	0	0	(Bangladesh Football Federation) Sheikh Jamal Dhanmondi Club
12	MF	Abdul Baten Mojumdar Komol	2 August 1987 (Age 24)	17	1	(Bangladesh Football Federation) Mohammedan
26	MF	Shahedul Alam Shahed	1 July 1993 (Age 18)	0	0	(Bangladesh Football Federation) Sheikh Jamal Dhanmondi Club
16	MF	Alamgir Kabir Rana	7 June 1990 (Age 21)	0	0	(Bangladesh Football Federation) Muktijoddha Sangsad
20	MF	Emon Mahmud Babu	3 June 1991 (Age 20)	4	0	(Bangladesh Football Federation) Sheikh Russel KC
10	FW	Zahid Hasan Ameli	25 December 1987 (Age 23)	43	9	(Bangladesh Football Federation) Mohammedan
25	FW	Mithun Chowdhury	10 February 1989 (Age 22)	11	1	(Bangladesh Football Federation) Chittagong Abahani Limited
48	FW	Mohammed Shah Alamgir Anik	7 June 1990 (Age 21)	0	0	(Bangladesh Football Federation) Brothers Union
15	FW	Abdul Malek				(Bangladesh Football Federation)

=== Maldives ===
Coach: (Hungary) István Urbányi

No.	Pos.	Player	Date of birth (age)	Caps	Goals	Club
25	GK	Imran Mohamed	18 December 1980 (Age 30)	55	0	(Football Association of Maldives) VB Sports Club
18	GK	Mohamed Faisal	8 April 1988 (Age 23)	4	0	(Football Association of Maldives) Victory
1	GK	Athif Ahmed	25 May 1988 (Age 23)			(Football Association of Maldives) Maziya
13	DF	Assad Abdul Ghanee	2 January 1976 (Age 35)	47	1	(Football Association of Maldives) Club Eagles
8	DF	Mohamed Jameel	4 October 1975 (Age 36)	50	1	(Football Association of Maldives) New Radiant
17	DF	Shafiu Ahmed	16 March 1987 (Age 24)	8	0	(Football Association of Maldives) Victory
19	DF	Akram Abdul Ghanee	19 March 1987 (Age 24)	20	0	(Football Association of Maldives) Maziya
20	DF	Faruhad Ismail	7 May 1979 (Age 32)	2	0	(Football Association of Maldives) VB Sports Club
3	MF	Mohamed Shifan	8 March 1983 (Age 28)	22	1	(Football Association of Maldives) Victory
4	MF	Mohamed Umair	3 March 1988 (Age 23)	18	1	(Football Association of Maldives) Victory
16	MF	Ismail Mohamed	16 March 1980 (Age 31)	32	2	(Football Association of Maldives) VB Sports Club
10	MF	Shamweel Qasim	20 June 1981 (Age 30)	33	3	(Football Association of Maldives) VB Sports Club
21	MF	Hassan Adhuham	8 January 1990 (Age 20)	4	0	(Football Association of Maldives) Victory
5	MF	Ibrahim Fazeel	8 October 1980 (Age 31)	58	21	(Football Association of Maldives) Victory
32	MF	Hussain Niyaz Mohamed	19 March 1987(Age 24)	4	0	(Football Association of Maldives) Maziya
	MF	Mohamed Hussain	12 October 1979(Age 32)	20	0	(Football Association of Maldives) VB Sports Club
7	FW	Ali Ashfaq (Captain)	5 September 1985 (Age 26)	41	20	(Football Association of Maldives) VB Sports Club
12	FW	Ali Fasir	4 September 1988 (Age 23)	9	0	(Football Association of Maldives) Victory
11	FW	Ashad Ali	14 September 1986 (Age 25)	18	2	(Football Association of Maldives) VB Sports Club
9	FW	Ahmed Thariq	4 October 1984 (Age 27)	27	13	(Football Association of Maldives) New Radiant
6	FW	Mohamed Arif	11 August 1985 (Age 26)	19	1	(Football Association of Maldives) VB Sports Club

=== Pakistan ===
Coach: (Serbia) Zaviša Milosavljević

No.	Pos.	Player	Date of birth (age)	Caps	Goals	Club
1	GK	Jaffar Khan (c)	10 March 1981 (aged 30)	37	0	(Pakistan Football Federation) Pakistan Army
23	GK	Saqib Hanif	28 April 1994 (aged 17)	0	0	(Pakistan Football Federation) ZTBL
22	GK	Muzammil Hussain	6 September 1993 (aged 18)	0	0	(Pakistan Football Federation) WAPDA
4	DF	Kamran Khan	3 September 1985 (aged 26)	0	0	(Pakistan Football Federation) KRL
5	DF	Samar Ishaq	1 January 1986 (aged 25)	27	1	(Pakistan Football Federation) KRL
16	DF	Manzoor Ahmed	2 January 1992 (aged 19)	6	0	(Pakistan Football Federation) WAPDA
2	DF	Naveed Ahmed	3 January 1993 (aged 18)	0	0	(Pakistan Football Federation) Pakistan Navy
19	DF	Rizwan Asif	1 August 1990 (aged 21)	6	0	(Pakistan Football Federation) KRL
3	DF	Mohammad Ahmed	3 January 1988 (aged 23)	3	0	(Pakistan Football Federation) WAPDA
14	DF	Alamgir Khan	16 June 1991 (aged 20)	0	0	(Pakistan Football Federation) Pakistan Police FC
6	MF	Atif Bashir	3 April 1985 (aged 26)	14	2	(Football Association of Wales) Barry Town
8	MF	Adnan Ahmed	7 June 1984 (aged 27)	18	4	(The Football Association) Bradford Park Avenue
7	MF	Faisal Iqbal	8 April 1992 (aged 19)	7	0	(Pakistan Football Federation) National Bank
13	MF	Ansar Abbas	15 April 1989 (aged 22)	1	0	(Pakistan Football Federation) Pakistan Army
10	MF	Kaleemullah Khan	9 August 1992 (aged 19)	10	0	(Pakistan Football Federation) KRL
20	MF	Saddam Hussain	10 April 1993 (aged 18)	2	0	(Pakistan Football Federation) PIA
21	MF	Muhammad Adil	9 July 1992 (aged 19)	5	0	(Pakistan Football Federation) KRL
17	MF	Muhammad Ikram	8 January 1988 (aged 23)	2	0	(Pakistan Football Federation) Pakistan Army
11	FW	Jadeed Khan	6 January 1989 (aged 22)	11	1	(Pakistan Football Federation) Afghan FC
9	FW	Junaid Qadir	20 December 1994 (aged 16)			(Pakistan Football Federation) Karachi Port Trust
15	FW	Hassnain Abbas	10 March 1990 (age 36)	2	0	(Pakistan Football Federation) KRL
18	FW	Shakir Lashari	6 January 1989 (aged 22)	0	0	(Pakistan Football Federation) PIA

=== Nepal ===
Coach: (England) Graham Roberts

No.	Pos.	Player	Date of birth (age)	Caps	Goals	Club
1	GK	Bikash Malla	15 August 1985 (aged 26)	20	0	(All Nepal Football Association) Nepal Army Club
16	GK	Kiran Kumar Limbu	20 March 1990 (aged 21)	11	0	(All Nepal Football Association) Three Star Club
20	GK	Ritesh Thapa	2 October 1984 (aged 27)	10	0	(All Nepal Football Association) Nepal Police Club
2	DF	Rabin Shrestha	26 December 1990 (aged 20)	11	0	(All Nepal Football Association) Nepal Police Club
3	DF	Biraj Maharjan	3 October 1987 (aged 24)	22	1	(All Nepal Football Association) Three Star Club
5	DF	Bikash Singh Chhetri	13 January 1988 (aged 23)	6	1	(All Nepal Football Association) Three Star Club
13	DF	Sandeep Rai	25 August 1988 (aged 23)	23	2	(All Nepal Football Association) Manang Marsyangdi
19	DF	Sagar Thapa	19 January 1984 (aged 27)	33	0	(All Nepal Football Association) Himalayan Sherpa Club
23	DF	Deepak Bhusal	22 January 1990 (age 36)	6	0	(All Nepal Football Association) Manang Marsyangdi
32	DF	Rohit Chand	1 March 1992 (aged 19)	14	0	(All India Football Federation) HAL
7	MF	Bijaya Gurung	11 October 1985 (aged 26)	19	4	(All Nepal Football Association) Three Star Club
8	MF	Nirajan Khadka	20 December 1988 (aged 22)	15	0	(All Nepal Football Association) Manang Marsyangdi
15	MF	Raju Tamang	27 October 1985 (aged 26)	16	1	(All Nepal Football Association) Nepal Army Club
17	MF	Bhola Silwal	4 January 1987 (aged 24)	12	1	(All Nepal Football Association) Nepal Police Club
22	MF	Jagjit Shrestha	10 August 1992 (aged 19)	4	1	(All Nepal Football Association) Himalayan Sherpa Club
4	FW	Sujal Shrestha	5 February 1992 (aged 19)	3	1	(All Nepal Football Association) Manang Marsyangdi
9	FW	Santosh Sahukhala	10 January 1988 (aged 23)	12	2	(All Nepal Football Association) Manang Marsyangdi
10	FW	Anil Gurung	23 September 1988 (aged 23)	20	8	(All Nepal Football Association) Manang Marsyangdi
11	FW	Ju Manu Rai	1 March 1983 (aged 28)	28	9	(All Nepal Football Association) Nepal Police Club
21	FW	Bharat Khawas	16 April 1992 (aged 19)	9	3	(All Nepal Football Association) Nepal Police Club
