= 2012 AFC Challenge Cup squads =

Below are the squads for the 2012 AFC Challenge Cup in Nepal, that took place between 8 and 19 March 2012. The players' listed age is their age on the tournament's opening day (8 March 2012).

== Group A ==
=== Turkmenistan ===
Coach: Ýazguly Hojageldiýew

No.	Pos.	Player	Date of birth (age)	Caps	Club
1	GK	Rahmanberdi Alyhanow	19 January 1986 (aged 26)		(Turkmenistan) HTTU
2	DF	Hemayat Komekow	3 May 1991 (aged 20)		(Turkmenistan) HTTU
3	DF	Goçguly Goçgulyýew	26 May 1977 (aged 34)		(Turkmenistan) Gara Altyn
6	MF	Ruslan Mingazow	23 November 1991 (aged 20)		(Latvia) Skonto
7	FW	Berdi Şamyradow (c)	22 June 1982 (aged 29)		(Turkmenistan) Aşgabat
8	FW	Bagtyýar Hojaahmedow	14 February 1985 (aged 27)		(Turkmenistan) Merw
9	MF	Didar Durdiýew	16 July 1993 (aged 18)		(Turkmenistan) Aşgabat
12	DF	Serdar Annaorazow	29 June 1990 (aged 21)		(Turkmenistan) HTTU
14	DF	Guwanç Rejepow	20 April 1982 (aged 29)		(Turkmenistan) HTTU
15	MF	Nazar Çöliýew	21 July 1986 (aged 25)		(Turkmenistan) Aşgabat
17	FW	Arslanmyrat Amanow	28 March 1990 (aged 21)		(Turkmenistan) HTTU
18	DF	Şöhrat Soyunow	8 March 1992 (aged 20)		(Turkmenistan) HTTU
19	MF	Ahmet Ataýew	20 April 1982 (aged 29)		(Turkmenistan) HTTU
20	FW	Gahrymanberdi Çoňkaýew	19 October 1983 (aged 28)		(Turkmenistan) FC Balkan
21	MF	Guwanç Hangeldiýew	9 August 1987 (aged 24)		(Turkmenistan) HTTU
22	FW	Guwanç Abylow	30 March 1988 (aged 23)		(Turkmenistan) Aşgabat
23	DF	Dawid Sarkisow	20 November 1982 (aged 29)		(Turkmenistan) HTTU
24	DF	Rahimberdy Baltaýew	16 June 1986 (aged 25)		(Turkmenistan) Aşgabat
25	GK	Mämed Orazmuhamedow	20 December 1986 (aged 25)		(Turkmenistan) HTTU
26	MF	Elman Tagaýew	2 June 1989 (aged 22)		(Turkmenistan) Aşgabat
30	MF	Umijan Astanow	11 August 1990 (aged 21)		(Turkmenistan) Merw
34	DF	Akmyrat Jumanazarow	5 November 1987 (aged 24)		(Turkmenistan) Merw

=== Maldives ===
Coach: (Hungary) István Urbányi

No.	Pos.	Player	Date of birth (age)	Caps	Club
1	GK	Athif Ahmed	25 May 1988 (aged 23)		(Maldives) Maziya
2	DF	Ahmed Abdulla	11 March 1987 (aged 24)		(Maldives) New Radiant SC
3	DF	Mohamed Shifan	8 March 1983 (aged 29)		(Maldives) Victory SC
4	MF	Mohammad Umair	3 July 1988 (aged 23)		(Maldives) VB Sports Club
5	MF	Ibrahim Fazeel	9 October 1980 (aged 31)		(Maldives) Victory SC
6	FW	Mohamed Arif	11 August 1985 (aged 26)		(Maldives) VB Sports Club
7	FW	Ali Ashfaq (c)	5 September 1985 (aged 26)		(Maldives) New Radiant SC
8	DF	Rilwan Waheed	14 February 1991 (aged 21)		(Maldives) Victory SC
9	FW	Ahmed Thariq	4 October 1980 (aged 31)		(Maldives) New Radiant SC
11	FW	Ashad Ali	14 September 1986 (aged 25)		(Maldives) VB Sports Club
13	DF	Akram Abdul Ghanee	19 March 1987 (aged 24)		(Maldives) VB Sports Club
17	DF	Shafiu Ahmed	13 November 1979 (aged 32)		(Maldives) Club Valencia
19	FW	Mohamed Rasheed	15 April 1985 (aged 26)		(Maldives) Victory SC
20	DF	Faruhad Ismail	7 May 1977 (aged 34)		(Maldives) VB Sports Club
21	FW	Hassan Adhuham	8 January 1990 (aged 22)		(Maldives) Victory SC
22	GK	Mohamed Yamaan	16 June 1988 (aged 23)		(Maldives) unknown
23	MF	Mukhthar Naseer	7 May 1979 (aged 32)		(Maldives) Victory SC
24	MF	Ahmed Nashid	4 April 1989 (aged 22)		(Maldives) VB Sports Club
25	GK	Imran Mohamed	18 December 1980 (aged 31)		(Maldives) Club Valencia
28	DF	Mohamed Thasneem	24 June 1987 (aged 24)		(Maldives) Maziya
32	MF	Mohamed Hussain Niyaz	19 March 1987 (aged 24)		(Maldives) Victory SC
33	DF	Abdullah Ibrahim	3 September 1988 (aged 23)		(Maldives) unknown

=== Nepal ===
Coach: (England) Graham Roberts

No.	Pos.	Player	Date of birth (age)	Caps	Club
1	GK	Bikash Malla	15 August 1985 (aged 26)		Nepal Army
2	DF	Rabin Shrestha	26 December 1990 (aged 21)		Nepal Police
3	DF	Biraj Maharjan	3 October 1987 (aged 24)		(Nepal) Three Star
4	DF	Deepak Bhushal	22 January 1990 (aged 22)		(Nepal) Manang Marshyangdi
6	DF	Rohit Chand	1 March 1992 (aged 20)		(India) HAL
8	MF	Nirajan Khadka	20 December 1988 (aged 23)		(Nepal) Manang Marshyangdi
9	FW	Santosh Sahukhala	10 January 1988 (aged 24)		(Nepal) Manang Marshyangdi
10	FW	Anil Gurung	23 September 1988 (aged 23)		(Nepal) Manang Marshyangdi
11	FW	Ju Manu Rai	1 March 1983 (aged 29)		Nepal Police
13	DF	Sandip Rai	25 September 1988 (aged 23)		(Nepal) Manang Marshyangdi
15	MF	Raju Tamang	27 October 1985 (aged 26)		Nepal Army
16	GK	Kiran Chemjong	20 March 1990 (aged 21)		(Nepal) Three Star
17	MF	Bhola Silwal	4 January 1987 (aged 25)		Nepal Police
18	FW	Ganesh Lawati	1 June 1981 (aged 30)		(Nepal) Armed Police Force
19	DF	Sagar Thapa (c)	19 January 1984 (aged 28)		(Nepal) Himalayan Sherpa
20	GK	Ritesh Thapa	2 October 1984 (aged 27)		Nepal Police
21	FW	Bharat Khawas	16 April 1992 (aged 19)		Nepal Police
24	DF	Jitendra Karki	26 August 1987 (aged 24)		(Nepal) New Road
27	DF	Sabindra Shrestha	5 January 1992 (aged 20)		(Nepal) Manang Marshyangdi
28	MF	Tanka Basnet	13 December 1990 (aged 21)		Nepal Army

=== Palestine ===
Coach: (Jordan) Jamal Mahmoud

No.	Pos.	Player	Date of birth (age)	Caps	Club
1	GK	Toufic Ali	8 November 1990 (aged 21)		(Palestine) Wadi Al-Nes
5	DF	Abdelatif Bahdari	20 February 1984 (aged 28)		(Saudi Arabia) Hajer Club
6	MF	Mousa Abu Jazar	25 August 1987 (aged 24)		(Palestine) Shabab Al-Khaleel
7	MF	Ashraf Nu'man	29 July 1986 (aged 25)		(Palestine) Wadi Al-Nes
10	FW	Fahed Attal	1 January 1985 (aged 27)		(Palestine) Shabab Al-Khaleel
12	MF	Houssam Wadi	8 January 1986 (aged 26)		(Palestine) Ittihad Al-Shajaiya
13	FW	Alaa Attieh	3 June 1990 (aged 21)		(Jordan) Al-Yarmouk
14	MF	Mohammed Samara	1 January 1983 (aged 29)		(Egypt) Arab Contractors
16	GK	Mohammed Shbair	6 December 1986 (aged 25)		(Palestine) Shabab Al-Khaleel
17	FW	Khaled Salem	17 November 1989 (aged 22)		(Palestine) Shabab Al-Dhahrieh
18	MF	Hussam Abu Saleh	5 September 1982 (aged 29)		(Palestine) Hilal Al-Quds
19	MF	Abdelhamid Abuhabib	8 June 1989 (aged 22)		(Palestine) Merkaz Balata
20	MF	Khader Yousef	10 June 1984 (aged 27)		(Palestine) Wadi Al-Nes
21	GK	Ramzi Saleh (c)	8 August 1980 (aged 31)		(Egypt) Smouha
22	DF	Ahmed Harbi	7 April 1986 (aged 25)		(Palestine) Al-Am'ary
23	MF	Murad Ismail Said	15 December 1982 (aged 29)		(Palestine) Hilal Al-Quds
24	FW	Mohammed Jamal	22 May 1988 (aged 23)		(Palestine) Shabab Al-Khaleel
25	DF	Ahmed Salameh	11 July 1989 (aged 22)		(Palestine) Al-Am'ary
27	MF	Ahmad Maher Wridat	22 July 1991 (aged 20)		(Palestine) Shabab Al-Dhahrieh
28	DF	Nadim Barghouthi	9 May 1989 (aged 22)		(Palestine) Shabab Al-Khaleel
33	DF	Khaled Mahdi	1 February 1987 (aged 25)		(Palestine) Al-Am'ary
35	MF	Ma'aly Kaware	11 March 1983 (aged 28)		(Palestine) Al-Am'ary
38	DF	Samer Hijazi	6 December 1988 (aged 23)		(Palestine) Jabal Al-Mukaber

== Group B ==
=== North Korea ===
Coach: Yun Jong-Su

No.	Pos.	Player	Date of birth (age)	Caps	Club
1	GK	Ri Myong-Guk	9 September 1986 (aged 25)		(North Korea) Pyongyang City
4	MF	Pak Nam-Chol I	2 July 1985 (aged 26)		(North Korea) April 25
5	DF	Ri Kwang-Chon (c)	4 September 1985 (aged 26)		(Thailand) Muangthong United
7	FW	Pak Song-Chol II	20 March 1991 (aged 20)		(North Korea) April 25
8	MF	Ri Chol-Myong	18 February 1988 (aged 24)		(North Korea) Pyongyang City
10	FW	Pak Kwang-Ryong	27 September 1992 (aged 19)		(Switzerland) Basel
11	FW	Jong Il-Gwan	30 October 1992 (aged 19)		(North Korea) Rimyongsu
12	DF	Jon Kwang-Ik	5 April 1988 (aged 23)		(North Korea) Amrokgang
13	FW	Jang Myong-Il	25 April 1986 (aged 25)		(North Korea) Amrokgang
14	DF	Pak Nam-Chol II	3 October 1988 (aged 23)		(North Korea) Amrokgang
15	MF	Ri Hyon-Song	23 December 1992 (aged 19)		(North Korea) Rimyongsu
17	MF	An Yong-Hak	25 October 1978 (aged 33)		(Japan) Kashiwa Reysol
18	GK	Kim Myong-Gil	16 October 1984 (aged 27)		(North Korea) Amrokgang
19	MF	Jang Kuk-Chol	16 February 1994 (aged 18)		(North Korea) Rimyongsu
20	DF	Ri Kwang-Hyok	17 August 1987 (aged 24)		(North Korea) Kyonggongop
21	GK	Ju Kwang-Min	20 May 1990 (aged 21)		(North Korea) Kigwancha
22	MF	Pak Song-Chol I	24 September 1987 (aged 24)		(North Korea) Rimyongsu
23	DF	Jang Song-Hyok	18 January 1991 (aged 21)		(North Korea) Rimyongsu
24	DF	Ri Il-Jin	20 August 1993 (aged 18)		(North Korea) Sobaeksu
25	FW	Kim Ju-Song	15 October 1993 (aged 18)		(North Korea) April 25
26	DF	Ri Hyong-Mu	4 November 1991 (aged 20)		(North Korea) Sobaeksu

=== Philippines ===
Coach: (Germany) Michael Weiß

No.	Pos.	Player	Date of birth (age)	Club
1	GK	Neil Etheridge	7 February 1990 (aged 22)	(The Football Association) Fulham
2	DF	Rob Gier	6 January 1981 (aged 31)	(The Football Association) Ascot United
5	DF	Juan Luis Guirado	27 August 1979 (aged 32)	(Philippine Football Federation) Global FC
6	DF	Roel Gener	27 June 1974 (aged 37)	(Philippine Football Federation) Philippine Army
7	MF	James Younghusband	4 September 1986 (aged 25)	(Philippine Football Federation) Loyola
9	MF	Misagh Bahadoran	10 January 1987 (aged 25)	(Philippine Football Federation) Global FC
10	FW	Phil Younghusband	4 August 1987 (aged 24)	(Philippine Football Federation) Loyola
12	FW	Ángel Guirado	9 December 1984 (aged 27)	(Philippine Football Federation) Global FC
13	MF	Emelio Caligdong (c)	28 September 1982 (aged 29)	(Philippine Football Federation) Philippine Air Force
14	DF	Carli de Murga	30 November 1988 (aged 23)	(Philippine Football Federation) Global FC
17	MF	Jason de Jong	28 February 1990 (aged 22)	(Royal Dutch Football Association) Dordrecht
19	MF	Nestorio Margarse	3 May 1976 (aged 35)	(Philippine Football Federation) Philippine Army
22	MF	Paul Mulders	16 January 1981 (aged 31)	(Royal Dutch Football Association) ADO Den Haag
23	FW	Ian Araneta	2 March 1982 (aged 30)	(Philippine Football Federation) Philippine Air Force
24	MF	Marwin Angeles	9 January 1991 (aged 21)	(Philippine Football Federation) Laos FC
27	DF	Ray Jónsson	3 February 1979 (aged 33)	(Football Association of Iceland) Grindavik
29	MF	Lexton Moy	24 January 1985 (aged 27)	(Philippine Football Federation) Kaya
35	DF	Dennis Cagara	19 February 1985 (aged 27)	(German Football Association) FSV Frankfurt
36	DF	Roxy Dorlas	2 September 1987 (aged 24)	(Philippine Football Federation) Loyola
37	MF	Angelo Verheye	14 May 1992 (aged 19)	(Royal Belgian Football Association) Gent
41	GK	Eduard Sacapaño	14 February 1980 (aged 32)	(Philippine Football Federation) Philippine Army
42	DF	Jason Sabio	30 June 1986 (aged 25)	(Philippine Football Federation) Kaya
44	GK	Paolo Pascual	22 January 1991 (aged 21)	(Philippine Football Federation) Global FC

=== India ===
Coach: Savio Medeira

No.	Pos.	Player	Date of birth (age)	Caps	Club
1	GK	Karanjit Singh	8 January 1986 (aged 26)		(India) Salgaocar
3	DF	Raju Gaikwad	25 September 1990 (aged 21)		(India) East Bengal
4	DF	Nirmal Chettri	21 October 1990 (aged 21)		(India) East Bengal
5	DF	Anwar Ali	24 September 1984 (aged 27)		(India) Mohun Bagan
6	FW	C. S. Sabeeth	2 December 1990 (aged 21)		(India) Pailan Arrows
9	FW	Joaquim Abranches	28 October 1985 (aged 26)		(India) Dempo
11	FW	Sunil Chhetri (c)	3 August 1984 (aged 27)		(India) Mohun Bagan
12	MF	Anthony Pereira	9 April 1982 (aged 29)		(India) Dempo
16	DF	Samir Subash Naik	8 August 1979 (aged 32)		(India) Dempo
17	MF	Adil Khan	7 July 1988 (aged 23)		(India) Sporting Goa
18	FW	Sushil Kumar Singh	1 April 1989 (aged 22)		(India) Shillong Lajong
19	DF	Gouramangi Singh	25 January 1986 (aged 26)		(India) Churchill Brothers
20	MF	Lalrindika Ralte	7 September 1992 (aged 19)		(India) Churchill Brothers
21	MF	Rocus Lamare	26 September 1986 (aged 25)		(India) Salgaocar
22	DF	Syed Rahim Nabi	14 December 1985 (aged 26)		(India) Mohun Bagan
25	GK	Subhasish Roy Chowdhury	27 September 1985 (aged 26)		(India) Dempo
26	MF	Francis Fernandes	25 November 1985 (aged 26)		(India) Salgaocar
27	DF	Gurjinder Kumar	10 October 1990 (aged 21)		(India) Pune
28	MF	Jewel Raja Shaikh	19 January 1990 (aged 22)		(India) Mohun Bagan
32	MF	Reisangmei Vashum	10 January 1988 (aged 24)		(India) East Bengal
36	GK	Arindam Bhattacharya	25 March 1988 (aged 23)		(India) Churchill Brothers
40	DF	Kingshuk Debnath	7 May 1985 (aged 26)		(India) Mohun Bagan
47	MF	Lenny Rodrigues	10 May 1987 (aged 24)		(India) Churchill Brothers

=== Tajikistan ===
Coach: (Bosnia and Herzegovina) Kemal Alispahić

No.	Pos.	Player	Date of birth (age)	Caps	Club
1	GK	Alisher Tuychiev	3 March 1976 (aged 36)		(Tajikistan) Esteghlal Dushanbe
2	DF	Farrukh Choriev	24 July 1984 (aged 27)		(Tajikistan) Regar-TadAZ
3	DF	Sokhib Suvonkulov	15 September 1988 (aged 23)		(Tajikistan) Esteghlal Dushanbe
4	DF	Eraj Rajabov	9 November 1990 (aged 21)		(Tajikistan) Esteghlal Dushanbe
6	DF	Davron Ergashev	19 March 1988 (aged 23)		(Tajikistan) Esteghlal Dushanbe
7	MF	Ibrahim Rabimov	3 August 1987 (aged 24)		(Tajikistan) Esteghlal Dushanbe
8	FW	Mahmadali Sodikov (c)	20 March 1984 (aged 27)		(Tajikistan) Esteghlal Dushanbe
9	MF	Nuriddin Davronov	16 January 1991 (aged 21)		(Tajikistan) Esteghlal Dushanbe
10	MF	Jakhongir Jalilov	28 September 1989 (aged 22)		(Tajikistan) Esteghlal Dushanbe
11	FW	Farhod Tohirov	29 May 1990 (aged 21)		(Tajikistan) Esteghlal Dushanbe
12	DF	Akhtam Nazarov	8 February 1988 (aged 24)		(Tajikistan) Energetik
13	FW	Akhtam Khamroqulov	30 January 1988 (aged 24)		(Tajikistan) Regar-TadAZ
15	DF	Umed Khabibulloev	12 November 1978 (aged 33)		(Tajikistan) Esteghlal Dushanbe
17	FW	Dilshod Vasiev	12 February 1988 (aged 24)		(Tajikistan) Esteghlal Dushanbe
18	MF	Fatkhullo Fatkhuloev	24 March 1990 (aged 21)		(Tajikistan) Esteghlal Dushanbe
20	MF	Khurshed Mahmudov	8 August 1982 (aged 29)		(Tajikistan) Regar-TadAZ
22	FW	Yusuf Rabiev	24 December 1979 (aged 32)		(Tajikistan) Esteghlal Dushanbe
23	GK	Vladimir Sysoev	5 August 1983 (aged 28)		(Tajikistan) Regar-TadAZ
25	FW	Kamil Saidov	25 January 1989 (aged 23)		(Tajikistan) CSKA Pomir
34	MF	Ilkhomjon Ortiqov	25 October 1985 (aged 26)		(Tajikistan) CSKA Pomir
36	GK	Saidjon Saidrahmonov	29 June 1987 (aged 24)		(Tajikistan) Ravshan
44	DF	Alexei Negmatov	4 January 1986 (aged 26)		(Tajikistan) Vakhsh
47	DF	Daler Tukhtasunov	27 August 1986 (aged 25)		(Tajikistan) Regar-TadAZ
