= 2008 AFC Challenge Cup squads =

Below are the squads for the 2008 AFC Challenge Cup in India, that took place between 30 July and 13 August 2008. The players' listed age is their age on the tournament's opening day (30 July 2008).

== Group A ==
=== Turkmenistan ===
Coach: Rahim Kurbanmamedov

No.	Pos.	Player	Date of birth (age)	Caps	Club
1	GK	Maksatmyrat Şamyradow	6 May 1984 (aged 24)	—	(Turkmenistan) Aşgabat
2	DF	Parahat Annaberdiýew	10 January 1980 (aged 28)	—	(Turkmenistan) Aşgabat
4	DF	Begli Annageldiýew	24 May 1984 (aged 24)	—	(Turkmenistan) HTTU
7	FW	Berdi Şamyradow	22 June 1982 (aged 26)	—	(Turkmenistan) HTTU
9	FW	Mämmedaly Garadanow	17 March 1982 (aged 26)	—	(Azerbaijan) Karvan
11	FW	Döwletmyrat Ataýew	16 March 1983 (aged 25)	—	(Uzbekistan) Shurtan Guzar
12	GK	Baýramnyýaz Berdiýew (c)	13 September 1974 (aged 33)	—	(Turkmenistan) Aşgabat
15	DF	Guwanç Rejepow	20 April 1982 (aged 26)	—	(Turkmenistan) HTTU
16	MF	Begençmuhammet Kulyýew	4 April 1977 (aged 31)	—	(Turkmenistan) Aşgabat
19	DF	Mekan Nasyrow	16 April 1982 (aged 26)	—	(Azerbaijan) Karvan
24	MF	Wýaçeslaw Krendelew	24 July 1982 (aged 26)	—	(Russia) Amkar Perm
25	FW	Gahrymanberdi Çoňkaýew	19 October 1983 (aged 24)	—	(Kazakhstan) Okzhetpes
26	DF	Rustam Saparow	10 April 1978 (aged 30)	—	(Turkmenistan) Aşgabat
30	MF	Bagtyýar Hojaahmedow	14 February 1985 (aged 23)	—	(Turkmenistan) Altyn Asyr
31	MF	Guwançmuhammet Öwekow	2 February 1981 (aged 27)	—	(Ukraine) Kharkiv
34	DF	Parahat Meredow	6 April 1986 (aged 22)	—	(Turkmenistan) Nebitçi Balkanabat
35	MF	Vitaliy Alikperow	1 August 1978 (aged 29)	—	(Turkmenistan) Merw
36	GK	Rahmanberdi Alyhanow	19 January 1986 (aged 22)	—	(Turkmenistan) HTTU
37	FW	Ýusup Orazmämmedow	25 July 1986 (aged 22)	—	(Turkmenistan) Aşgabat
38	DF	Aleksey Pronçenko	6 July 1983 (aged 25)	—	(Turkmenistan) Köpetdag
39	DF	Ýakup Ekezow	1 March 1983 (aged 25)	—	(Turkmenistan) HTTU
42	MF	Serdar Geldiýew	1 October 1987 (aged 20)	—	(Turkmenistan) Aşgabat
43	FW	Guwanç Hangeldiýew	9 August 1987 (aged 20)	—	(Turkmenistan) Aşgabat

=== Tajikistan ===
Coach: Pulod Kodirov

No.	Pos.	Player	Date of birth (age)	Caps	Club
1	GK	Alisher Tuychiev	3 March 1976 (aged 32)	—	(Uzbekistan) Metallurg Bekabad
2	DF	Daler Tukhtasunov	27 August 1986 (aged 21)	—	(Tajikistan) Regar-TadAZ
3	DF	Naim Nasirov	28 April 1986 (aged 22)	—	(Tajikistan) Regar-TadAZ
6	DF	Davron Ergashev	19 March 1988 (aged 20)	—	(Tajikistan) Regar-TadAZ
9	MF	Anvar Norkulov	4 November 1975 (aged 32)	—	(Tajikistan) Parvoz Bobojon
11	FW	Numonjon Hakimov	5 September 1978 (aged 29)	—	(Tajikistan) Parvoz Bobojon
12	DF	Eraj Rajabov	9 November 1990 (aged 17)	—	(Tajikistan) Dynamo Dushanbe
14	MF	Samad Shohzukhurov	8 February 1990 (aged 18)	—	(Tajikistan) Dynamo Dushanbe
15	DF	Zafardzhon Zuvaydov	23 July 1980 (aged 28)	—	(Tajikistan) Regar-TadAZ
16	GK	Mirali Murodov	20 April 1990 (aged 18)	—	(Tajikistan) Dynamo Dushanbe
17	DF	Sokhib Suvonkulov	15 September 1988 (aged 19)	—	(Tajikistan) Vakhsh
18	MF	Fatkhullo Fatkhuloev	24 March 1990 (aged 18)	—	(Tajikistan) Dynamo Dushanbe
19	FW	Dzhomikhon Mukhidinov	15 April 1976 (aged 32)	—	(Tajikistan) Parvoz Bobojon
20	FW	Davronjon Tukhtasunov	14 May 1990 (aged 18)	—	(Tajikistan) Regar-TadAZ
22	MF	Yusuf Rabiev (c)	24 December 1979 (aged 28)	—	(Tajikistan) Vakhsh
24	DF	Suhrob Mansurov	11 April 1988 (aged 20)	—	(Tajikistan) Energetik Dushanbe
27	DF	Isomiddin Qurvonov	12 September 1990 (aged 17)	—	(Tajikistan) Dynamo Dushanbe
29	FW	Dzhakhongir Dzhalilov	28 September 1989 (aged 18)	—	(Tajikistan) unknown
31	MF	Eradzh Kholov	6 January 1990 (aged 18)	—	(Tajikistan) Ravshan Kulob
40	GK	Amonsho Sodatsayrov	1 October 1971 (aged 36)	—	(Tajikistan) unknown

=== India ===
Coach: (England) Bob Houghton

No.	Pos.	Player	Date of birth (age)	Caps	Club
1	GK	Subrata Pal	24 December 1986 (aged 21)	—	(India) East Bengal
2	DF	Moirangthem Govin Singh	3 January 1988 (aged 20)	—	(India) East Bengal
4	MF	Krishnan Nair Ajayan	3 May 1983 (aged 25)	—	(India) Mahindra United
5	DF	Anwar	24 September 1984 (aged 23)	—	(India) JCT
6	DF	Baldeep Singh	12 January 1987 (aged 21)	—	(India) JCT
7	MF	Pappachen Pradeep	28 April 1983 (aged 25)	—	(India) Mahindra United
8	MF	Renedy Singh	20 June 1979 (aged 29)	—	(India) JCT
11	FW	Sunil Chhetri	3 August 1984 (aged 23)	—	(India) JCT
14	DF	Mahesh Gawli	23 January 1980 (aged 28)	—	(India) Dempo
15	FW	Baichung Bhutia (c)	15 June 1976 (aged 32)	—	(India) Mohun Bagan
17	DF	Irungbam Surkumar Singh	21 March 1983 (aged 25)	—	(India) East Bengal
18	FW	Sushil Kumar Singh	25 June 1984 (aged 24)	—	(India) Mahindra United
19	DF	Gouramangi Singh	25 January 1986 (aged 22)	—	(India) Churchill Brothers
20	DF	Samir Subash Naik	8 August 1979 (aged 28)	—	(India) Dempo
21	FW	Abhishek Yadav	10 June 1980 (aged 28)	—	(India) Mumbai
22	DF	Syed Rahim Nabi	12 December 1982 (aged 25)	—	(India) East Bengal
23	MF	Steven Dias	25 December 1983 (aged 24)	—	(India) Mahindra United
24	GK	Subhasish Roy Chowdhury	27 September 1986 (aged 21)	—	(India) Mahindra United
25	MF	Clifford Miranda	11 July 1982 (aged 26)	—	(India) Dempo
27	MF	Mehrajuddin Wadoo	12 February 1984 (aged 24)	—	(India) East Bengal
28	FW	Bungo Thomchok Singh	2 March 1983 (aged 25)	—	(India) Pune
30	MF	Climax Lawrence	16 January 1979 (aged 29)	—	(India) Dempo

=== Afghanistan ===
Coach: Mohammad Yousef Kargar

No.	Pos.	Player	Date of birth (age)	Caps	Club
1	GK	Shamsuddin Amiri	12 February 1985 (aged 23)	—	(Afghanistan) Kabul Bank
2	DF	Bashir Ahmad Saadat (c)	27 December 1981 (aged 26)	—	(Afghanistan) Maiwand
3	DF	Zohib Islam Amiri	19 April 1989 (aged 19)	—	(Afghanistan) Kabul Bank
4	DF	Qudratullah Hussaini	11 March 1984 (aged 24)	—	unknown
5	DF	Ali Yarzada	15 October 1985 (aged 22)	—	unknown
6	DF	Mohamed Ibrahim Jebran	22 February 1988 (aged 20)	—	unknown
7	MF	Israfeel Kohistani	5 June 1987 (aged 21)	—	(Afghanistan) Kabul Bank
8	MF	Sayed Bashir Azimi	27 May 1984 (aged 24)	—	unknown
9	FW	Hamidullah Rastagar	8 May 1988 (aged 20)	—	unknown
10	FW	Hafizullah Qadami	20 February 1985 (aged 23)	—	(Afghanistan) Kabul Bank
11	DF	Muqadar Qazizadah	11 September 1988 (aged 19)	—	unknown
12	MF	Mohammad Salem Nahemi	3 March 1988 (aged 20)	—	(Germany) Eintracht Frankfurt II
13	DF	Faisal Sakhizada	22 October 1990 (aged 17)	—	(Afghanistan) Kam Air FC
14	MF	Sayed Maqsood Hashemi	15 September 1985 (aged 22)	—	(Afghanistan) Maiwand Kabul
16	DF	Djelaludin Sharityar	15 March 1983 (aged 25)	—	(Germany) SpVgg Weiden
18	GK	Emal Gariwal	17 May 1986 (aged 22)	—	unknown
21	MF	Ata Yamrali	5 July 1982 (aged 26)	—	(Germany) ASV Bergedorf 85
22	FW	Abdul Saboor Aser	11 January 1988 (aged 20)	—	unknown

== Group B ==
=== North Korea ===
Coach: Jo Tong-Sop

No.	Pos.	Player	Date of birth (age)	Caps	Club
1	GK	Ju Kwang-min	20 May 1990 (aged 18)	—	(North Korea) Kigwancha
2	DF	Pak Chol-ryong	3 November 1988 (aged 19)	—	(North Korea) Kigwancha
3	DF	Ri Kwang-hyok	17 August 1987 (aged 20)	—	(North Korea) Kyonggongop
4	DF	Mun Kyong-nam	8 April 1989 (aged 19)	—	(North Korea) Amrokgang
5	DF	Pak Nam-chol	3 October 1988 (aged 19)	—	(North Korea) Amrokgang
7	DF	Yun Yong-il	31 July 1988 (aged 19)	—	(North Korea) Wolmido
8	DF	Jon Kwang-ik	5 April 1988 (aged 20)	—	(North Korea) Amrokgang
9	MF	Pak Song-chol (c)	24 September 1987 (aged 20)	—	(North Korea) Rimyongsu
11	FW	Pak Chol-min	10 December 1988 (aged 19)	—	(North Korea) Rimyongsu
12	FW	So Kwang-chol	23 January 1987 (aged 21)	—	(North Korea) Amrokgang
13	MF	Ri Jin-hyok	28 August 1989 (aged 18)	—	(North Korea) Rimyongsu
15	MF	Kim Kuk-jin	5 January 1989 (aged 19)	—	(North Korea) Pyongyang City
16	FW	Ho Jong-min	27 May 1988 (aged 20)	—	(North Korea) unknown
17	DF	Ro Hak-su	19 January 1990 (aged 18)	—	(North Korea) Rimyongsu
18	MF	An Hyok-il	10 January 1991 (aged 17)	—	(North Korea) Pyongyang City
19	MF	Choe Myong-ho	3 July 1988 (aged 20)	—	(Russia) Krylia Sovetov
20	GK	Ri Yun-chol	unknown	—	(North Korea) unknown
21	GK	Ri Yu-chol	unknown	—	(North Korea) unknown
22	DF	Han Song-hyok	11 December 1987 (aged 20)	—	(North Korea) Rimyongsu
23	MF	Kim Kyong-il	11 December 1988 (aged 19)	—	(North Korea) Rimyongsu
24	FW	So Tae-song	10 September 1990 (aged 17)	—	(Denmark) Nordsjælland

=== Sri Lanka ===
Coach: (South Korea) Jang Jung

No.	Pos.	Player	Date of birth (age)	Caps	Club
1	GK	Dammika Thilakaratne	6 October 1977 (aged 30)	—	(Sri Lanka) Ratnam SC
2	DF	Nirantha Perera	29 February 1984 (aged 24)	—	(Sri Lanka) Army SC
3	DF	Sanjay Silva	unknown	—	Sri Lanka Navy
4	DF	Rohana Ruwan Thilaka (c)	21 September 1984 (aged 23)	—	(Sri Lanka) Red Sun SC
5	DF	Cristeen Fernando	7 August 1982 (aged 25)	—	(Sri Lanka) Jupiters SC
6	MF	Mohamed Izzadeen	8 June 1979 (aged 29)	—	(Sri Lanka) Ratnam SC
7	MF	Chathura Maduranga	28 January 1981 (aged 27)	—	(Sri Lanka) Ratnam SC
8	MF	Lahiru Tharaka	20 April 1989 (aged 19)	—	unknown
10	FW	Channa Ediri Bandanage	22 September 1978 (aged 29)	—	(Sri Lanka) Ratnam SC
11	FW	Kasun Jayasuriya	25 March 1980 (aged 28)	—	(Sri Lanka) Ratnam SC
12	FW	Nuwantha Charaka	20 October 1986 (aged 21)	—	(Sri Lanka) Police SC
16	FW	Nadeeka Pushpakumara	11 March 1986 (aged 22)	—	(Sri Lanka) Ratnam SC
17	DF	Suranda Bandara	28 May 1988 (aged 20)	—	unknown
18	FW	Dhammika Rathnayaka	25 August 1977 (aged 30)	—	(Sri Lanka) Negombo Youth SC
19	MF	Thuwan Raheem	11 September 1979 (aged 28)	—	(Sri Lanka) Air Force SC
20	GK	Sandun Devinda	20 May 1981 (aged 27)	—	(Maldives) New Radiant SC
21	GK	Viraj Asanka	17 May 1987 (aged 21)	—	(Sri Lanka) Saunders SC
22	FW	Chathura Samarasekera	22 December 1985 (aged 22)	—	(Sri Lanka) Saunders SC
23	MF	Chamira Krishantha	31 March 1989 (aged 19)	—	unknown
24	DF	Madushka Peiris	5 October 1987 (aged 20)	—	(Sri Lanka) Negombo Youth SC
25	DF	Chathura Gunarathna	8 September 1982 (aged 25)	—	(Sri Lanka) Ratnam SC
29	MF	Tharusha Rangana	18 May 1982 (aged 26)	—	(Sri Lanka) Ratnam SC

=== Myanmar ===
Coach: (Brazil) Marcos Falopa

No.	Pos.	Player	Date of birth (age)	Caps	Club
1	GK	Aung Aung Oo	8 June 1982 (aged 26)	—	(Myanmar) Ministry of Finance & Revenue
2	DF	U Min Thu	2 June 1979 (aged 29)	—	(Myanmar) Ministry of Commerce
3	DF	Thura Aung	27 March 1990 (aged 18)	—	(Myanmar) Kanbawza
5	DF	Moe Win	30 March 1988 (aged 20)	—	(Myanmar) Kanbawza
6	DF	Khin Maung Lwin	14 July 1980 (aged 28)	—	(Myanmar) Kanbawza
7	MF	Aung Myo Thant	1 December 1985 (aged 22)	—	(Myanmar) Ministry of Commerce
8	MF	Zaw Htet Aung	11 May 1987 (aged 21)	—	(Myanmar) Ministry of Energy
9	FW	Yan Paing	27 November 1983 (aged 24)	—	(Myanmar) Ministry of Finance & Revenue
10	FW	Soe Myat Min (c)	19 May 1982 (aged 26)	—	(Myanmar) Ministry of Finance & Revenue
11	MF	Myo Min Tun	14 July 1986 (aged 22)	—	(Myanmar) Ministry of Commerce
12	MF	Soe Thiha Aung	12 December 1988 (aged 19)	—	(Myanmar) Ministry of Construction
13	DF	Han Win Aung	17 December 1986 (aged 21)	—	(Myanmar) Kanbawza
15	MF	Tun Tun Win	15 December 1987 (aged 20)	—	(Myanmar) Ministry of Finance & Revenue
16	MF	Yazar Win Thein	9 April 1986 (aged 22)	—	(Myanmar) Ministry of Commerce
17	DF	Aye San	24 December 1988 (aged 19)	—	(Myanmar) Kanbawza
18	FW	Si Thu Win	5 October 1985 (aged 22)	—	(Myanmar) Ministry of Home Affairs
20	DF	Kyaw Zayar Win	2 June 1991 (aged 17)	—	(Myanmar) Ministry of Transport
22	GK	Kyaw Zin Htet	2 March 1987 (aged 21)	—	(Myanmar) Kanbawza
24	FW	Tun Min Oo	29 November 1986 (aged 21)	—	(Myanmar) Kanbawza
26	MF	Pai Soe	22 January 1987 (aged 21)	—	(Myanmar) Ministry of Finance & Revenue
28	DF	Htay Aung	15 August 1985 (aged 22)	—	(Myanmar) Ministry of Defence
29	MF	Aung Kyaw Moe	2 July 1982 (aged 26)	—	(Myanmar) Ministry of Finance & Revenue
50	GK	Nyi Nyi Lwin	11 August 1983 (aged 24)	—	(Myanmar) Ministry of Home Affairs

=== Nepal ===
Coach: Birat Krishna Shrestha

No.	Pos.	Player	Date of birth (age)	Caps	Club
1	GK	Bikash Malla	15 August 1985 (aged 22)	—	(Nepal) Tribhuvan Army
2	DF	Rabin Shrestha	26 December 1990 (aged 17)	—	(Nepal) Mahendra Police
3	DF	Suman Subedi	27 July 1988 (aged 20)	—	(Nepal) Mahendra Police
4	DF	Rakesh Shrestha (c)	14 January 1977 (aged 31)	—	(Nepal) Mahendra Police
5	DF	Chun Bahadur Thapa	13 December 1978 (aged 29)	—	(Nepal) Tribhuvan Army
6	DF	Lok Bandhu Gurung	29 August 1985 (aged 22)	—	(Bangladesh) Abahani Chittagong
7	MF	Bijay Gurung	11 October 1985 (aged 22)	—	(Nepal) Three Star
8	MF	Anant Raj Thapa	19 October 1977 (aged 30)	—	(Nepal) Mahendra Police
9	FW	Nirajan Rayamajhi	29 January 1980 (aged 28)	—	(Nepal) New Road
11	FW	Ju Manu Rai	1 March 1983 (aged 25)	—	(Nepal) Mahendra Police
12	MF	Nirajan Khadka	6 October 1988 (aged 19)	—	(Nepal) Manang Marsyangdi
13	MF	Thakali	11 May 1984 (aged 24)	—	(Nepal) Three Star
14	DF	K.C. Anjan	14 December 1986 (aged 21)	—	(Nepal) Three Star
15	MF	Raju Tamang	27 October 1985 (aged 22)	—	(Nepal) Tribhuvan Army
16	MF	Sandip Rai	25 August 1988 (aged 19)	—	(Nepal) Manang Marsyangdi
18	FW	Santosh Sahukhala	10 January 1988 (aged 20)	—	(Bangladesh) Abahani Chittagong
19	DF	Sagar Thapa	19 April 1985 (aged 23)	—	(Nepal) New Road
21	DF	Biraj Maharjan	1 January 1990 (aged 18)	—	(Nepal) New Road
22	GK	Ritesh Thapa	2 October 1984 (aged 23)	—	(Nepal) Mahendra Police
23	MF	Parbat Pandey	1 October 1979 (aged 28)	—	(Nepal) Mahendra Police
28	FW	Yugal Kishor Rai	3 September 1985 (aged 22)	—	(Nepal) New Road
35	MF	Bhola Silwal	4 January 1987 (aged 21)	—	(Nepal) Mahendra Police
44	GK	Samit Raj Bhandari	5 May 1985 (aged 23)	—	unknown
