= Man Bahadur Gurung =

Man Bahadur Gurung may refer to:

- Man Bahadur Gurung (footballer)
- Man Bahadur Gurung (politician)
