= Naveed Ahmed =

Pakistani international footballer

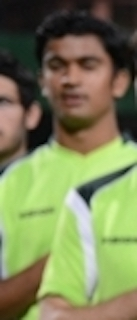
- Ahmed with Pakistan in 2013

Personal information
- Date of birth: 3 January 1993 (age 33)
- Place of birth: Faisalabad, Pakistan
- Position: Centre-back

Team information
- Current team: Pakistan Navy
- Number: 5

Senior career*
Years	Team	Apps	(Gls)
2009–	Pakistan Navy	128	(10)

International career^{‡}
2011	Pakistan U20		
2011–2015	Pakistan U23		
2012–2019	Pakistan	17	(0)
- * Club domestic league appearances and goals as of January 13, 2019 ‡ National team caps and goals as of September 12, 2019

Naveed Ahmed (born 3 January 1993) is a Pakistani footballer who plays for Pakistan Navy, which he captains. Mainly a centre-back, he played as a midfielder in his early career.

== Club career ==
Ahmed started playing football at the age of 16 in a local club at his village in Faisalabad. He hails from the same village as former international player Haji Abdul Sattar, who scored the solitary goal at the 1989 South Asian Games football final, where Pakistan was crowned champions after defeating Bangladesh 1–0.

After participating in trials, Ahmed was picked by Pakistan Premier League departmental side Pakistan Navy in 2009.

== International career ==
In 2011, Ahmed participated in the 2012 AFC U-19 Championship qualification with the Pakistan under-19 team, scoring in a 1–2 defeat against Turkmenistan.

In June 2011, he was called by the under-23 team in the 2013 AFC U-22 Championship qualification. He was first called by the senior team in the 2011 SAFF Championship. He played his first international match on 19 November 2012 against Singapore in their 4–0 international friendly defeat. He was subsequently called in February 2013, making two appearances in both two-match friendlies against Nepal, both ending in a 1–0 victory for Pakistan. He then played in a two-match tour against Maldives in the same month. In March 2013, he participated in the 2014 AFC Challenge Cup qualification, playing against Tajikistan and Kyrgyzstan. He played in two friendlies against Afghanistan in 2013 and 2015 respectively and in 2014 against Palestine. He remained as unused substitute in the 2013 SAFF Championship. He participated in the 2014 Asian Games. In May 2015, Ahmed also participated in the 2016 AFC U-23 Championship qualification, making 3 appearances in the campaign.

In 2018, Ahmed made all four appearances in the 2018 SAFF Championship, when Pakistan returned to international circuit after 3 years ban by FIFA in 2015. In December 2018, Ahmed also captained the national team in practice matches in Doha, as preparation for the next World Cup qualifiers, after the injury of captain Saddam Hussain. In 2019, Ahmed played in the 2022 World Cup qualification against Cambodia.

== Career statistics ==
=== Club ===
As of 13 January 2019

Appearances and goals by club, season and competition
Club	Season	League			Cup (Note: Includes National Football Challenge Cup.)		Total	
Club	Season	Division	Apps	Goals	Apps	Goals	Apps	Goals
Pakistan Navy	2009–10	Pakistan Premier League	15	0	5	0	20	0
Pakistan Navy	2010–11	Pakistan Premier League	20	1	6	1	26	2
Pakistan Navy	2011–12	Pakistan Premier League	25	3	3	0	28	3
Pakistan Navy	2012–13	Pakistan Premier League	20	1	4	0	24	1
Pakistan Navy	2013–14	Pakistan Premier League	23	2	—		23	2
Pakistan Navy	2014–15	Football Federation League	4	1	2	0	5	1
Pakistan Navy	2018–19	Pakistan Premier League	21	2	4	0	25	2
Pakistan Navy	Total		128	10	24	1	152	11
Career total			128	10	24	1	152	11

=== International ===
As of 12 September 2019

Appearances and goals by national team and year
National team	Year	Apps	Goals
Pakistan	2012	1	0
Pakistan	2013	7	0
Pakistan	2014	1	0
Pakistan	2015	1	0
Pakistan	2018	6	0
Pakistan	2019	1	0
Total		17	0
