= Anjan KC =

Nepalese footballer

Anjan KC (Nepali: अन्जन के.सी; born 14 December 1986 in Lalitpur, Nepal) is a footballer from Nepal. He played for Nepal national football team between 2005 and 2009. KC appeared in 2 FIFA World Cup qualifying matches for Nepal during the first round of 2008 Asian qualifiers.

== Match fixing allegations ==
On 14 October 2015 KC, along with Nepali national football team players Sandip Rai, Sagar Thapa, Ritesh Thapa were arrested by the Nepal Police on suspicion of match-fixing at the domestic and international level.
