= Friends Club =

- Full name: Friends Club
- Founded: 16 May 1972; 54 years ago
- Ground: Pulchowk Campus, Lalitpur, Nepal
- Capacity: 10,000
- Chairman: Bishwas Bikram Shah
- Head coach: Urjan Shrestha
- League: Martyr's Memorial A-Division League; Nepal National League (sometimes)
- 2023: Martyr's Memorial A-Division League, 11th of 14

Friends Club is a Nepali professional football club from the Kopundole neighborhood of Lalitpur. The club is known for nurturing young talent of Nepalese football. Friends Club has produced more than 200 national football players to date.

Since the late 1980s, the club has implemented different training activities for women and children. The team practices on the grounds of Pulchok Campus. National players like Raju Tamang, Bharat Khawas, Sagar Thapa, Nirajan Khadka or Deepak Bhusal are products of Friends Club.

== History ==
Friends Club was established in 1972 as a children's club with a reading-room facility in Kopundol. After a couple of years of its establishment, the club diversified its social activities with a motto of "better health through sports among the people of Kopundol". Eventually, Friends Club established itself as a well-reputed local sports club. It was since late eighties that the club started implementing various training activities for women and children. It also started a health clinic and pathology laboratory which eventually became very popular among the people of Kopundol and surrounding community. In 1996, the club toured to Bangladesh and took part in Bangabandhu Cup.

== Achievements ==
- Tribhuvan Challenge Shield (2): 1985, 1986
- Birthday Cup runner up (1): 2042 (BS)

== Head coaching record ==
updated on 14 May 2020

Name	Nationality	From	To	P	W	D	L	GF	GA	Win%
Ramesh Maharjan	Nepal	2018	2019	13	3	3	7	13	25	23.08
Marcos Filipe	Brazil	2019	2020	13	4	2	7	12	19	30.77

== League finishes ==
The season-by-season performance of FC since 2000:

Champions	Runners-up	Third place	Promoted	Relegated

Season	League	Position
2000	A-Division	11th
2001–2002	League not held	
2003-04	A-Division	5th
2004	A-Division	5th
2005–2006	A-Division	12th
2006–2007	A-Division	7th
2008–2009	League not held due to conflicts between ANFA and the clubs	
2010	A-Division	8th
2011	A-Division	6th
2011–12	National	7th
2012–13	A-Division	4th
2013–14	A-Division	8th
2015	National	banned by ANFA
2017–2018	No league held	
2018–19	A-Division	11th
2019–20	A-Division	11th
2020-21	A-Division	Not held due to COVID-19
2021–22	A-Division	12th
2023	A-Division	11th
