= Bikash Singh Chhetri =

Nepalese footballer

Personal information
- Full name: Bikash Singh Chhetri
- Date of birth: February 19, 1992 (age 34)
- Height: 1.76 m (5 ft 9 in)
- Position: Defender

Team information
- Current team: Manang Marshyangdi Club

Senior career*
Years	Team	Apps	(Gls)
2008–2012	Three Star Club		
2012–	Manang Marshyangdi Club		

International career
2011–	Nepal	11	(1)
- * Club domestic league appearances and goals

Bikash Singh Chhetri (Nepali: बिकास सिंह क्षेत्री; born 19 February 1992) is a footballer from Nepal. He played for Nepal national football team in the 2014 FIFA World Cup qualification and various other tournaments.

== International career ==
Bikash Singh Chhetri played for Nepal in 3 World Cup qualifying matches. He also played for Nepal in the 2012 Nehru Cup. He was sent off though in a 0–0 draw with India. He scored his first international goal in a 2–1 win against Bhutan.

=== International goals ===
#	Date	Venue	Opponent	Score	Result	Competition
1.	19 March 2011	Pokhara Rangasala, Pokhara, Nepal	Bhutan	2–1	2–1	Friendly

== Match fixing allegations ==
On 14 October 2015 Singh, along with teammates Sandip Rai, Sagar Thapa, Ritesh Thapa and former Three Star Club coach Anjan KC were arrested by the Nepal Police on suspicion that the group was responsible for match-fixing at the domestic and international level. On 19 October 2015 Chhetri and the four others were banned by the Asian Football Confederation.
