= Tshering Dendup =

Bhutanese professional footballer

Personal information
- Full name: Tshering Dendup
- Date of birth: 21 January 1992 (age 34)
- Place of birth: Thimphu, Bhutan
- Height: 1.75 m (5 ft 9 in)
- Position: Goalkeeper

Team information
- Current team: Thimphu City

Senior career*
Years	Team	Apps	(Gls)
2012–2013	Yeedzin		
2014–2018	Druk United		
2018	Phuensum		
2019–2021	Transport United		
2021–2024	Druk Lhayul		

International career
2018–	Bhutan	9	(0)
- * Club domestic league appearances and goals

Tshering Dendup (born 21 January 1992) is a Bhutanese professional footballer. He has represented the Bhutan national football team and the Bhutan national futsal team.
