= Sanka Danushka =

Sri Lankan international footballer

Personal information
- Full name: Kosgala Wathukarage Sanka Danushka
- Date of birth: 28 December 1984 (age 41)
- Place of birth: Sri Lanka
- Position: Defender

Team information
- Current team: SL Army

Senior career*
Years	Team	Apps	(Gls)
2010–	SL Army		

International career^{‡}
2011–	Sri Lanka	7	(0)
- * Club domestic league appearances and goals ‡ National team caps and goals as of 26 July 2013

Sanka Danushka is a Sri Lankan professional footballer who plays as a defender for Sri Lanka Army in the Sri Lanka Football Premier League.
