= Jean-Patrick Abouna =

Cameroonian footballer

Personal information
- Full name: Jean-Patrick Abouna Ndzana
- Date of birth: 27 September 1990 (age 36)
- Place of birth: Douala, Cameroon
- Height: 1.73 m (5 ft 8 in)
- Position: Full-back

Senior career*
Years	Team	Apps	(Gls)
2008–2009	Authentique de Douala		
2009–2013	Astres		
2014–2016	AC Léopards		
2017–2018	Neman Grodno	51	(1)
2019–2020	Olympique de Genève	13	(1)
2020–2021	Grand-Saconnex		

International career^{‡}
2010–2016	Cameroon	12	(0)
- * Club domestic league appearances and goals as of 19 February 2020 ‡ National team caps and goals as of 15:07, 24 April 2019 (UTC)

Jean-Patrick Abouna Ndzana (born 27 September 1990) is a Cameroonian former footballer who played as a full back.

== Club career ==
Abouna spent his early career in Cameroon for Authentique de Douala and Astres. He left Cameroon for Congolese side Léopards de Dolisie in December 2013. He signed for Belarusian club Neman Grodno in 2017.

Abouna joined Swiss club Olympique de Genève ahead of the 2019–20 season, and Grand-Saconnex later that season.

== International career ==
Abouna made his senior debut for the Cameroon national team in 2010.
