= Nadim Barghouthi =

Palestinian footballer

Nadim Barghouthi Arabic: نديم البرغوثي
Personal information
- Date of birth: 9 May 1989 (age 37)
- Place of birth: Palestinian Territories
- Height: 1.85 m (6 ft 1 in)
- Position: Central defender

Team information
- Current team: Shabab Al-Khaleel
- Number: 24

Senior career*
Years	Team	Apps	(Gls)
2009–2010	Al-Bireh		
2010–2011	Al-Am'ary		
2011–	Shabab Al-Khaleel		

International career
2009–2013	Palestine	12	(0)
- * Club domestic league appearances and goals

Nadim Barghouthi (Arabic: نديم البرغوثي) is a Palestinian footballer who plays his club football for Shabab Al-Khaleel. He is primarily used as a centre-back.
