= Ali Ghalioum =

Iraqi footballer (born 1987)

Personal information
- Date of birth: 20 June 1987 (age 39)
- Place of birth: Talkalakh, Syria
- Height: 1.73 m (5 ft 8 in)
- Position: Attacking midfielder

Team information
- Current team: Al-Harjalah
- Number: 16

Senior career*
Years	Team	Apps	(Gls)
2005–2010	Al-Wathba		
2010–2013	Al-Shorta		
2013–2015	Shabab Al-Sahel	40	(10)
2015–2016	Al Hikma	20	(2)
2016–2017	Al-Quwa Al-Jawiya		
2018–2019	Al-Wathba		
2019-	Al-Harjalah		

International career^{‡}
2005–2006	Syria U-20		
2007	Syria U-23		
2012	Syria	4	(1)
- * Club domestic league appearances and goals ‡ National team caps and goals as of 25 February 2013

Ali Ghalioum (Arabic: علي غليوم; born 20 June 1987) is a Syrian footballer who plays for Al-Harjalah, which competes in the Syrian League the top division in Syria. His younger brother Bakr plays at Al-Wathba.

== Honours ==
=== Club ===
Al-Quwa Al-Jawiya

- AFC Cup: 2016
