= Yasser Shoshara =

Syrian footballer

Personal information
- Full name: Mohammad Yasser Shoshara
- Date of birth: 11 April 1988 (age 38)
- Place of birth: Damascus, Syria
- Height: 1.88 m (6 ft 2 in)
- Positions: Centre back; defensive midfielder

Senior career*
Years	Team	Apps	(Gls)
2007–2009	Al-Wahda		
2009–2010	Al-Taliya		
2010–2013	Al-Wahda		
2013	Al-Zawraa	3	(0)
2014–2018	Al-Wahda		

International career^{‡}
2008	Syria U-20		
2009–2011	Syria U-23		
2012–2013	Syria	6	(0)
- * Club domestic league appearances and goals ‡ National team caps and goals as of 31 December 2013

Mohammad Yasser Shoshara (Arabic: محمد ياسر شوشرة) (born 11 April 1988, in Syria) is a Syrian footballer. He currently plays for Al-Wahda, which competes in the Syrian Premier League, the top division in Syria.
