= Man Bahadur Gurung (footballer) =

Bhutanese footballer

Personal information
- Full name: Man Bahadur Gurung
- Date of birth: 15 March 1993 (age 33)
- Place of birth: Samtse, Bhutan
- Height: 1.67 m (5 ft 6 in)
- Position: Defender

Senior career*
Years	Team	Apps	(Gls)
2010	Druk Star		
2014–2015	Ugyen Academy		
2015–2020	Thimphu City		

International career^{‡}
2011–2018	Bhutan	15	(0)
- * Club domestic league appearances and goals ‡ National team caps and goals as of 27 March 2023

Man Bahadur Gurung is a Bhutanese professional footballer who last played for Thimphu City. He represented the Bhutan national team between 2011 and 2018.
