= Mohamad Zbida =

Syrian footballer (born 1990)

Mohamad Zbida محمد زبيدة
Personal information
- Full name: Mohamad Zbida
- Date of birth: 20 May 1990 (age 36)
- Place of birth: Damascus, Syria
- Height: 1.79 m (5 ft 10 1/2 in)
- Position: Centre back

Team information
- Current team: Al-Jaish

Youth career
- Al-Wahda

Senior career*
Years	Team	Apps	(Gls)
2007–2010	Al-Wahda		
2010–2014	Al-Jaish		

International career
2007	Syria U-17		
2007–2008	Syria U-20		
2009–2012	Syria U-23		
2008–	Syria	7	(0)
- * Club domestic league appearances and goals as of 8 June 2010

Mohamad Zbida (Arabic: محمد زبيدة; born 20 May 1990 in Damascus, Syria) is a Syrian footballer. He currently plays for Al-Jaish, which competes in the Syrian Premier League, the top division in Syria. He plays as a defender.

== Club career ==
Zbida started his professional career with Al-Wahda in the 2007–08 Syrian Premier League season. On 27 May 2010, he moved to Al-Jaish in the Syrian Premier League and signed a 3-year contract.

== International career ==
Between 2007 and 2008, he played for the Under-17 and the Under-19 Syrian national team, including the Syrian U-17 national team that participated in the FIFA U-17 World Cup 2007 in South Korea.

He plays against Argentina, Spain and Honduras in the group-stage of the FIFA U-17 World Cup 2007 and against England in the Round of 16.

Zbida was part of the Syrian U-19 squad in the 2008 AFC U-19 Championship where he played in all three group games.

== Honour and titles ==
=== National team ===
- FIFA U-17 World Cup 2007: Round of 16
