= Rahmanberdi Alyhanow =

Turkmen footballer

Personal information
- Date of birth: 19 January 1986
- Place of birth: Turkmenistan
- Date of death: 29 December 2014 (aged 28)
- Place of death: Istanbul, Turkey
- Height: 1.86 m (6 ft 1 in)
- Position: Goalkeeper

Senior career*
Years	Team	Apps	(Gls)
? –	HTTU Aşgabat		
2014	Altyn Asyr FK		

International career
2011–2013	Turkmenistan	12	(0)
- * Club domestic league appearances and goals

Rahmanberdi Alyhanow (19 January 1986 – 29 January 2014) was a Turkmen footballer, who played a goalkeeper for FC HTTU, Altyn Asyr FK and Turkmenistan national football team.

== Club career ==
Alyahanow won the gold medal in the 2014 Ýokary Liga with Altyn Asyr FK, and was the second top scorer (26 goals).

Alyahanow died on 29 December 2014 after a failed operation in a clinic in Istanbul. The following day, he was buried in Turkmenistan.
