= Mohamad Afa Al Rifai =

Syrian footballer (born 1988)

Personal information
- Date of birth: April 6, 1988 (age 38)
- Place of birth: Al-Tall, Syria
- Height: 1.78 m (5 ft 10 in)
- Position: Midfielder

Team information
- Current team: Al-Turra

Senior career*
Years	Team	Apps	(Gls)
2007–2013	Al-Jaish		
2013–2015	Ittihad Al-Ramtha	21	(8)
2015–2016	Al-Tura		
2016–2021	Al-Karmel		

International career
2009–2011	Syria U-23		
2008–2012	Syria	5	(0)
- * Club domestic league appearances and goals

Mohamad Afa Al Rifai (Arabic: محمد عفا الرفاعي) (born 6 April 1988 in Syria) is a Syrian retired footballer who last played for Al-Karmel.
