= Deepak Bhusal =

Nepalese footballer

Personal information
- Full name: Deepak Bhusal
- Date of birth: 6 January 1992 (age 34)
- Place of birth: Kathmandu, Nepal
- Height: 5 ft 9 in (1.75 m)
- Position: Defender

Team information
- Current team: Manang Marshyangdi Club
- Number: 4

International career
Years	Team	Apps	(Gls)
2009–	Nepal	17	(0)

Deepak Bhusal (born 6 January 1992) is a footballer from Nepal. He made his first appearance for the Nepal national football team in 2009.

== Club career ==
Bhusal was born in Kathmandu. After graduating from ANFA Academy in 2006 he joined the Sankata Boys Sports Club, four years later he then joined Friends Club where he was captain, and four years after that he then signed for the Manang Marshyangdi Club. Played from Nepal Police Club (NEPA CUP) in Kathmandu in AAHA Gold Cup, Played from N.R.T Club West Sikkim.

== International career ==
Bhusal has 8 caps for Nepal so far. He played Nepal's final match against Turkmenistan in a 3-0 loss at the 2012 AFC Challenge Cup. List of all the International levels Deepak played: 1) ASIAN Youth U-14 festival of football, 9–15 April 2004, Kathmandu Nepal. 2) AFC Youth U-17 Championship Qualification 2005, Kathmandu, Nepal. 3) AFC U-17 Championship, Singapore, 2006 A.D. 4) AFC U-19 qualifiers. 5) AFC U-19 Championship 2010 A.D qualifiers. 6) AFC U-22 Championship 2013 A.D qualifiers 7) AFC Challenge Cup Qualifiers 2008 A.D. 8) AFC Challenge Cup Qualifiers 2009 A.D. 9) SAFF Championship India 2011 A.D. 10) AFC Challenge Cup 2012 qualifier. 11) FIFA World Cup Brazil, Asian qualifier 2014 A.D. 12) International Friendly Football match Cambodia- Nepal 2011. 13) Friendly match Philippines Vs Nepal, 2011 A.D Manila. 14) AFC President Cup Sri Lanka 2014 A.D. 15) Kings Cup M.M.C ( Bhutan ).

== Coaching career ==
Head Coach in Chaur Futsal, Coached in Lalit Memorial U-18 football tournament 2074 B.S, Coaching M.M.C, Coaching for 2 schools in Kathmandu.

== Achievements ==
Two times Best defender in Aaha Gold Cup, One time Man of the match.

== Certification ==
AFC "C" coaching certificate AFC, Level 1 coaching certificate.

== Disciplinary Issues ==
In January 2014 while captain of Friends Club Bhusal clashed with Bishal Shrestha after Bhusal committed a foul and Shrestha retaliated. They were both sent off by the referee and it took five minutes for the two to be led of the field. Both players were later issued a three-game ban by the ANFA.

In an AFC President's Cup against FC HTTU in the seventy-eighth minute Bhusal was again sent off by referee Adham Makhadmeh for a tough challenge on an opponent's player. MMC went on to lose the match 3-1.
