= Sayed Maqsood Hashemi =

Afghan footballer

Sayed Maqsood Hashemi is an Afghan footballer who has played for Ordu Kabul F.C. in Afghanistan, as well as Afghanistan national football team. He has 2 goals. He wears number 6 and plays as a defensive midfielder.
