= Taha Mosa =

Syrian footballer (born 1987)

Taha Mousa
Personal information
- Full name: Taha Mousa
- Date of birth: May 24, 1987 (age 39)
- Place of birth: Damascus, Syria
- Height: 1.88 m (6 ft 2 in)
- Position: Goalkeeper

Team information
- Current team: Hutteen

Senior career*
Years	Team	Apps	(Gls)
2005–2016	Al-Jaish		
2016–2022	Al-Wahda		
2022	→ Jableh SC (loan)		
2022–2024	Al-Fotuwa		
2024–	Hutteen		

International career^{‡}
2011–	Syria	6	(0)
- * Club domestic league appearances and goals ‡ National team caps and goals as of 6 September 2023

Taha Mousa (Arabic: طٰهٰ مُوسَى) (born 24 May 1987 in Syria) is a Syrian football player who plays for Hutteen.
