= Khaled Al-Brijawi =

Syrian footballer (born 1990)

Personal information
- Full name: Khaled Jamal Al-Brijawi
- Date of birth: 8 July 1990 (age 36)
- Place of birth: Damascus, Syria
- Height: 1.78 m (5 ft 10 in)
- Position: Centre-back

Team information
- Current team: Fanja

Youth career
- Al-Nidal
- Al-Majd

Senior career*
Years	Team	Apps	(Gls)
2008–2013	Al-Majd	?	(0)
2013–2015	Al-Seeb	19	
2015–	Fanja		

International career
2006–2007	Syria U-17		
2007–2008	Syria U-20		
2009–2012	Syria U-23		
2012–	Syria	4	(0)
- * Club domestic league appearances and goals

Khaled Jamal Al-Brijawi (Arabic: خالد جمال البريجاوي; born 8 July 1990), commonly known as Khaled Al-Brijawi, is a Syrian footballer who plays for Fanja in Oman Professional League.

== Club career ==
Khaled began his professional career in 2008 with Al-Majd SC Damascus.

After spending a five-seasons spell with Al-Majd SC in Syria, on 12 September 2013 he signed a one-year contract with Oman Professional League club Al-Seeb Club. On 17 August 2014, he signed a one-year contract extension with Al-Seeb Club.

=== Club career statistics ===
Club	Season	Division	League		Cup		Continental		Other		Total	
Club	Season	Division	Apps	Goals	Apps	Goals	Apps	Goals	Apps	Goals	Apps	Goals
Al-Seeb	2013–14	Oman Professional League	19	0	0	0	0	0	1	0	20	0
Al-Seeb	Total		19	0	0	0	0	0	1	0	20	0
Career total			19	0	0	0	0	0	1	0	20	0

== International career ==
From 2006 to 2008, he played for the Syria national under-17 football team and the Syria national under-20 football team. He was part of the squad that participated in the FIFA U-17 World Cup 2007 in South Korea. He played in two matches in the tournament, one in a 2–0 win over Honduras and another in the Round of 16 in a 3–1 loss against England. He was also member of the squad that participated in the 2008 AFC U-19 Championship.

He has made two appearances for the Syria national football team in the 2012 Nehru Cup.

== Honours ==
=== Club ===
- With Al-Majd
  - Syrian Cup (0): Runner-up 2009
  - Syrian Super Cup (0): Runners-up 2009
- With Al-Seeb

- Oman Professional League Cup (0): Runner-up 2013

=== National team ===
- FIFA U-17 World Cup 2007: Round of 16
