= Zakaria Al Omari =

Syrian footballer (born 1990)

Zakaria Al Omari محمد زكريا العمري
Personal information
- Full name: Mohamad Zakaria Al Omari
- Date of birth: 1 November 1990 (age 35)
- Place of birth: Azaz, Syria
- Positions: Right midfielder; right winger

Team information
- Current team: Al-Ittihad

Youth career
- Al-Ittihad

Senior career*
Years	Team	Apps	(Gls)
2007–2019	Al-Ittihad		
2007–2010	→Afrin (loan)		
2010–2011	→Omayya (loan)		
2013	→Naft Maysan (loan)		
2019–	Tishreen SC		

International career^{‡}
2011–2012	Syria U-23		
2012–	Syria	3	(0)
- * Club domestic league appearances and goals as of 13 December 2011 ‡ National team caps and goals as of 13 December 2011

Zakaria Al Omari is a Syrian footballer who plays for Tishreen SC, which competes in the Syrian Premier League
