= Bijaya Gurung =

Nepalese footballer

Personal information
- Full name: Bijaya Gurung
- Date of birth: October 11, 1985 (age 41)
- Place of birth: Kathmandu, Nepal
- Height: 1.63 m (5 ft 4 in)
- Position: Midfielder

Team information
- Current team: Three Star Club

International career
Years	Team	Apps	(Gls)
2005–2013	Nepal	33	(3)

Bijaya Gurung (Nepali: बिजय गुरुङ) is a Nepali team midfielder who currently plays for Three Star Club. Gurung was the last player in the national team from the first batch of ANFA Academy. Bijay, who started his professional football career from NIBL Friends Club in 2004. After spending one season with Friends, he joined Three Star and stayed there till 2009 winning ‘A’ Division League along with numerous knockout tournaments. After donning Laxmi Hyundai Manang Marshyagdi Club jersey for a season in 2010, Bijay returned to Three Star and helped the team lift League title for the second time.

== International career ==
He was the main creative midfielder for Nepal national football team.

Gurung was the key member of the U-19 national football team that cross the group stage of AFC U-19 Qualifiers for the first time in 2003.

He wore 7 number jersey for the national team. His debut was against India on December 8, 2005 during the Fourth SAFF Championship. He had a wonderful tournament in 2011 SAFF Championship. His last international match during group A qualifiers of AFC Challenge Cup at home turf against Palestine on March 6, 2013.

He declared his retirement after failing to make on the national squad for first time in 9 years during 2013 SAFF Championship. He gave the reasons of the recurring knee injury as well as the not able to maintain place in his own club, Three Star Club of Martyr's Memorial A-Division League.

=== International goals ===
#	Date	Venue	Opponent	Score	Result	Competition
1.	12 December 2005	Peoples Football Stadium, Karachi	Bhutan	3–0	3–1	2005 South Asian Football Federation Gold Cup
2.	17 October 2008	MBPJ Stadium, Petaling Jaya	Afghanistan	2–1	2–2	2008 Merdeka Tournament
3.	29 November 2009	Mohammedan Sporting Club (Kolkata)	Bhutan	2–1	2–1	Friendly
