= Sandip Rai =

Nepalese footballer

Personal information
- Full name: Sandip Rai
- Date of birth: 14 April 1989 (age 37)
- Place of birth: Lalitpur District, Nepal
- Height: 5 ft 10 in (1.78 m)
- Position: Defender

Team information
- Current team: Three Star Club

International career
Years	Team	Apps	(Gls)
2008–2015	Nepal	38	(3)

Sandip Rai (Nepali: सन्दिप राई) is a Nepali former professional footballer who played as a defender for Three Star Club in Martyr's Memorial A-Division League. He was voted the Nepalese Footballer of the Year in 2013. He was banned due to match-fixing.

== Mohammedan Sporting Club ==
He signed for I-League 2nd Division side Mohammedan Sporting Club in Kolkota in 2010.

== International ==
=== International goals ===
#	Date	Venue	Opponent	Score	Result	Competition
1	3 December 2011	Jawaharlal Nehru Stadium, New Delhi	Maldives	1–1	1–1	2011 SAFF Championship
2	2 March 2013	Dasarath Rangasala Stadium, Kathmandu, Nepal	Northern Mariana Islands	5–0	6–0	2014 AFC Challenge Cup qualification

== Match fixing allegations ==
On 14 October 2015 Rai, along with teammates Sagar Thapa, Bikash Singh Chhetri, Ritesh Thapa and former Three Star Club coach Anjan KC were arrested by the Nepal Police on suspicion of match-fixing at the domestic and international level. On 19 October 2015, Rai and the other four were banned by the Asian Football Confederation.
