= Sabindra Shrestha =

Nepalese footballer

Personal information
- Full name: Sabindra Shrestha
- Date of birth: 5 January 1992 (age 34)
- Place of birth: Pokhara, Nepal
- Height: 1.70 m (5 ft 7 in)
- Position: Defender

Team information
- Current team: Manang Marshyangdi Club

Senior career*
Years	Team	Apps	(Gls)
2012–	Manang Marshyangdi Club		

International career
2012–	Nepal	2	(0)
- * Club domestic league appearances and goals

Sabindra Shrestha (Nepali: सबिन्द्र श्रेष्ठ) (born 5 January 1992) is a footballer from Nepal. He made his first appearance for the Nepal national football team in 2012.

== Career ==
Shrestha is a defender, born in Pokhara. He attended the ANFA Academy and graduated in 2007. His career was put on halt due to a serious knee injury. He is known a determined defender who crosses and takes free kicks very well. He made his debut for Nepal during the 2012 AFC Challenge Cup.
