= István Urbányi =

Hungarian footballer (born 1967)

Personal information
- Date of birth: 17 April 1967 (age 59)
- Place of birth: Salgótarján, Hungary
- Position: Midfielder

Team information
- Current team: Maldives (head coach)

Youth career
- Mátranováki Vasas

Senior career*
Years	Team	Apps	(Gls)
1980–1986	Salgótarjáni BTC	68	(8)
1987–1988	Budapest Honvéd	3	(0)
1988–1990	Győri Rába ETO	58	(2)
1990–1992	Budapest Honvéd	42	(2)
1992–1995	BVSC	68	(6)
1995–1997	Kispest-Honvéd	38	(1)
1997–1998	San Jose Clash	23	(1)
1998	Kispest-Honvéd	14	(1)
Total		314	(21)

International career
1990	Hungary	2	(0)

Managerial career
- 2002: BKV Előre
- 2006–2008: Újpest
- 2009–2010: Maldives
- 2010: Kecskeméti TE
- 2011–2013: Maldives
- 2016–2017: Gyirmót SE
- 2017–2018: UMKC Kangaroos
- 2018: Kaw Valley FC
- 2025: Sporting Kansas City II
- 2026–: Maldives
- 2026–: Maldives U20
- * Club domestic league appearances and goals

István Urbányi (born 17 April 1967) is a Hungarian football coach and former player who is the head coach of the Maldives national team.

== Playing career ==
Urbányi was born in Salgótarján. As a player, he spent most of his career at Budapest Honvéd and Győri ETO as a defender and midfielder. In 1990, he played two games for the Hungary national team.

After a nearly two decade-long career, in 1999 he also trialled with FK Lofoten in Norway.

== Coaching career ==
=== Early career ===
He was the head coach of Újpest from December 2006 to April 2008.

=== Maldives ===
In the end of February 2009, he was appointed as the head coach of the Maldives national team. His first assignment as the coach of the Maldives was the AFC Challenge Cup qualification, where Maldives faced Bhutan, the Philippines and Turkmenistan. His contract ran out in 2010 and following the sides could not reach an agreement over an extension, Urbányi left the Maldives. After a brief spell on the bench of Kecskeméti TE, he was recalled by the Football Association of Maldives and worked again in the island nation between October 2011 and December 2013.

=== Sporting Kansas City ===
He joined the ranks of the Sporting Kansas City youth academy as a coach after the invitation of his longtime friend and team manager Peter Vermes On 30 January 2025, Urbányi was named head coach Sporting Kansas City II in MLS Next Pro. On 12 August 2025, it was announced that Urbányi was no longer with the club.

== Sources ==
- pepsifoci.hu: Urbányi István, az Újpest vezetőedzője - brief bio (in Hungarian)
