= Ritesh Thapa =

Nepalese footballer

Personal information
- Full name: Ritesh Thapa
- Date of birth: 2 October 1984 (age 42)
- Place of birth: Itahari, Nepal
- Height: 5 ft 9 in (1.75 m)
- Position: Goalkeeper

Team information
- Current team: Nepal Police Club

Senior career*
Years	Team	Apps	(Gls)
2000–2004	Three Star Club		
2004–2015	Nepal Police Club		

International career
2003–2015	Nepal	12	(1)
- * Club domestic league appearances and goals

Ritesh Thapa (Nepali: रितेश थापा; born 2 October 1984) is a former footballer from Nepal who played as goalkeeper. He made his first appearance for the Nepal national football team in 2003. He played for Nepal Police Club.

== Club career ==
Thapa was born in Itahari, Nepal. He started his career with the Three Star Club, but joined the Nepal Police Club four years later in 2004. He won many achievements with the Nepali Police Club, including a runners-up medal at the 2007 AFC President's Cup. He also won the Martyr's Memorial A-Division League four times with the Nepali Police Club.

== International career ==
Thapa made his debut for Nepal on September 29, 2003 although it was a dark day in his country's football history. Nepal were playing South Korea in the 2004 AFC Asian Cup qualification and lost by a record 16-0. Thapa came on as a half-time substitute for goalkeeper Ujjwal Manadhar in the game.

Thapa played two games at the 2012 Nehru Cup, picking up one yellow card.

He has made twelve appearances for his country so far.

== Honours ==
- AFC President's Cup
  - Runners-up: 2007
- Martyr's Memorial A-Division League
  - Winner: 2006–07, 2010, 2011, 2011–12
  - Runners-up: 2004–05

== Playing style ==
Thapa is known as a hardworking and dependable player in the squad and always has a positive attitude. He however lacks concentration during games.

== Personal life ==
Thapa is married.

== Match fixing allegations ==
On 14 October 2015 Thapa, along with teammates Sagar Thapa, Sandip Rai, Bikash Singh Chhetri, and former Three Star Club coach Anjan KC were arrested by the Nepal Police on suspicion that the group was responsible for match-fixing at the domestic and international level. On 19 October 2015 Rai and the four others were banned by the Asian Football Confederation.
