= Ju Manu Rai =

Nepalese footballer

Personal information
- Full name: Ju Manu Rai
- Date of birth: 24 January 1984 (age 42)
- Place of birth: Sarlahi, Nepal
- Height: 5 ft 5 in (1.65 m)
- Position: Striker

Team information
- Current team: Nepal Police club
- Number: 11

Youth career
- Jhapa FC: Boys Union Club

Senior career*
Years	Team	Apps	(Gls)
2002–2004	Machhindra FC	25	(9)
2004–2009	Nepal Police Club	80	(23)
2009	Club All Youth Linkage	6	(5)
2010–	Nepal Police Club	33	(21)

International career
2006–2015	Nepal	51	(11)
- * Club domestic league appearances and goals

Ju Manu Rai (Nepali: जुमानु राई; born 24 January 1984) is a Nepalese footballer, who played for Nepal Police Club and the national side.

== Career ==
Born in Sarlahi District, Nepal he used to play the local tournaments of football at Harion and other parts of Sarlahi and often bag with awards and shields during childhood. He was introduced to the public in Boys Union in an unsuccessful trial bid. He also played Association football for the Nepal Police Club, Machindra FC in the Division League. He was watched by Maldivian Club Vyansa. He played in the Kheladi Cup where he scored 5 goals. He later went on to play for All Youth Linkage of Maldives in the 2009 Wataniya Dhivehi League 3rd Round. He played half of the season scoring 11 goals. He is currently the captain of Nepal Police Club and holds a permanent post as an employee of Nepal Police.

== International career ==
On 5 April 2006, he made his debut against Brunei at AFC Challenge Cup, which was held in Bangladesh. Rai has played for the Nepal national football team. In 2008, he was on form after scoring five goals in four matches in AFC Challenge Cup. He has also played for Nepal in the 2008 SAFF Championship held in Maldives and Sri Lanka. He scored two goals in a friendly match against Mohun Bagan which Nepal won 3–1. He also played in 200o SAFF Championship which was held in Bangladesh. He scored the goal against Maldives national football team. His goal helped Nepal to draw 1-1. But Nepal Were out of the tournament. He scored four goals in three matches in British Gurkha Cup 2010. Nepal Police Club were out of the quarter-finals defeated by Three Star Club, who later on to be the champions. He has current goal tally of 10 making him the fourth highest scorer for Nepal.

On 5 September 2013 SAFF Championship, Jumanu scored the second goal in a 2–1 win over rival India, taking a pass from Rabin Shrestha to score his 11th international goals.

== International goals ==
No.	Date	Venue	Opponent	Score	Result	Competition
1.	24 May 2008	Phnom Penh, Cambodia	Macau	2–1	3–2	2008 AFC Challenge Cup qualification
2.	24 May 2008	Phnom Penh, Cambodia	Macau	3–2	3–2	2008 AFC Challenge Cup qualification
3.	26 May 2008	Phnom Penh, Cambodia	Cambodia	1–0	1–0	2008 AFC Challenge Cup qualification
4.	7 June 2008	Malé, Maldives	Pakistan	3–1	4–1	2008 SAFF Championship
5.	7 June 2008	Malé, Maldives	Pakistan	4–1	4–1	2008 SAFF Championship
6.	4 August 2008	Hyderabad, India	Sri Lanka	2–0	3–0	2008 AFC Challenge Cup
7.	5 December 2009	Dhaka, Bangladesh	Maldives	1–1	1–1	2009 SAFF Championship
8.	29 June 2011	Kathmandu, Nepal	Timor-Leste	2–1	2–1	2014 FIFA World Cup qualification
9.	2 July 2011	Kathmandu, Nepal	Timor-Leste	3–0	5–0	2014 FIFA World Cup qualification
10.	23 August 2012	Delhi, India	Maldives	1–2	1–2	2012 Nehru Cup
11.	5 September 2013	Kathmandu, Nepal	India	2–0	2–1	2013 SAFF Championship

== Honours ==
- 2007: Pulsar Player of the Year (PoY)
