= Hassan Adhuham =

Maldivian footballer

Personal information
- Date of birth: 8 January 1990 (age 36)
- Place of birth: Maldives
- Positions: Attacking midfielder; striker

Team information
- Current team: New Radiant

Senior career*
Years	Team	Apps	(Gls)
2007–2010	Victory		(4)
2011	VB Sports Club	0	(0)
2011–2012	Victory	23	(8)
2013	Maziya	0	(5)
2013	BG Sports Club	0	(0)
2014–2015	Eagles	0	(0)
2016	Club Valencia	0	(0)
2017	Victory		
2017–	New Radiant		

International career
2009–	Maldives	13	(3)
2010–	Maldives U23	10	(2)
- * Club domestic league appearances and goals

Hassan Adhuham (born 8 January 1990) is a Maldivian footballer who plays as an attacking midfielder or striker for Club Eagles.

== Career statistics ==
Scores and results list Maldives's goal tally first.

#	Date	Venue	Opponent	Score	Result	Competition
1.	8 March 2012	Halchowk Stadium, Kathmandu	Turkmenistan	0–1	3–1	2012 AFC Challenge Cup
