= Rabin Shrestha =

Nepalese footballer

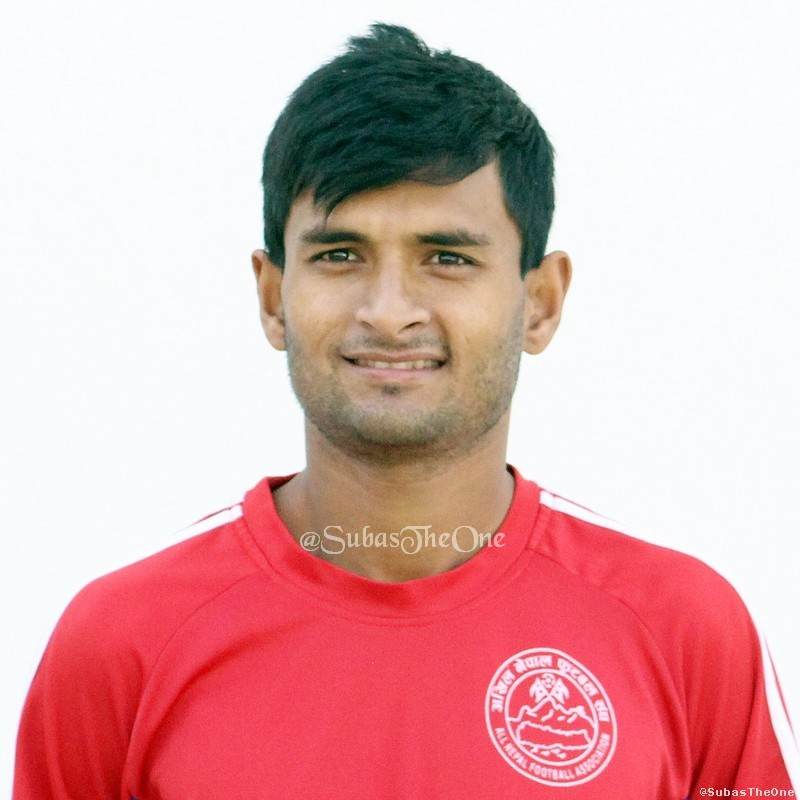

Personal information
- Full name: Rabin Shrestha
- Date of birth: 19 September 1989 (age 37)
- Place of birth: Jaleswor, Nepal
- Height: 1.71 m (5 ft 7 in)
- Position: Defender

Team information
- Current team: Nepal Police F.C. (women) (assistant)

Youth career
- 2006: ANFA Academy
- 2007: Sankata Boys Sports Club

Senior career*
Years	Team	Apps	(Gls)
2008–2024	Nepal Police Club		

International career
2008–2024	Nepal	42	(0)
- * Club domestic league appearances and goals

Rabin Shrestha (Nepali: रबिन श्रेष्ठ; born 17 May 1991) is a former professional footballer from Nepal. He made his first appearance for the Nepal national football team in 2008.

== Club career ==
Rabin Shrestha is a Nepalese defender who was born in Jaleswor. After graduating from ANFA Academy he joined the Sankata Boys Sports Club but a year later he signed for the Nepal Police Club in 2008.

In April 2014 Shrestha was heavenly linked with a move to the Manang Marshyangdi Club, although former player and coach Hari Khadka dismissed it as just a rumor.

== International career ==
Shresta played in the 2011 SAFF Championship and 2013 SAFF Championship for Nepal. In the latter tournament he received the best player award.
