= Bikash Malla =

Nepalese footballer (born 1986)

Major Bikash Malla
- Born: Bikash Malla Thakuri; August 15, 1986 (age 40); Chitwan, Nepal
- Military career
- Allegiance: Nepal
- Branch: Nepal
- Service years: 2005-present
- Rank: Major
Association football career
- Height: 1.72 m (5 ft 8 in)
- Position: Goalkeeper
Team information
- Current team: Nepal Army Club
Senior career*
Years	Team	Apps	(Gls)
- Nepal Army Club
International career
2005–2020	Nepal	17	(0)
Managerial career
- 2020-: Nepal (Goalkeeping Coach)
- * Club domestic league appearances and goals

Major Bikash Malla Thakuri (Nepali: बिकास मल्ल) (born 15 August 1986) is a retired footballer, army officer and football coach from Nepal. Bikash Malla is currently the goalkeeping coach of Nepal national football team. Experienced goalie Malla is major (सेनानी) by rank in Nepal Army and was skipper of the team. His goalkeeping skills have always been the cream of the crop. He was one of the most commanding players in the Nepal national football team.

After graduating from ANFA Academy, Malla joined Friends Club in 2060 B.S. He stole the limelight when Samsung JYC bought him in the highest price for the league season 2061/62. Malla then joined Laxmi Hyundai MMC in 2062 and played for a year before joining Nepal Army.

Malla - who has 19 caps - played his debut match for Nepal National team in 2005 in SAFF Championship, Karachi.

In June 2014 Malla was the winning captain as the Nepal Army Club won 3–1 over archrivals Nepal Police Club in the 2014 Bir Ganesh Man Singh Gold Cup Final. As the winning team the Nepali Army Club will receive 5 Lakhs (500,000 rupees) prize.
