= Nirajan Khadka =

Nepalese footballer

Personal information
- Full name: Nirajan Khadka
- Date of birth: October 6, 1988 (age 38)
- Place of birth: Nepal
- Height: 1.65 m (5 ft 5 in)
- Position: Midfielder

Team information
- Current team: Three Star Club

Senior career*
| Years | Team | Apps | (Gls) |
| 2005–07 | Friends Club | | |
| 2007–10 | Manang Marshyangdi Club | | |
| 2010–11 | Friends Club | | |
| 2011–12 | Manang Marshyangdi Club | | |
| 2012– | Three Star Club | | |

International career^{‡}
| 2008– | Nepal | 30 | (1) |
- * Club domestic league appearances and goals ‡ National team caps and goals as of 6 September 2018

Nirajan Khadka (Nepali: निराजन खड्का; born 6 October 1988) is a Nepalese professional footballer. He made his first appearance for the Nepal national football team in 2008.

== Club career ==
Khadha started his career at Friends Club for two years, before joining Manang Marshyangdi Club for three years. Khadka then rejoined Friends Club for one season, and then rejoined Manang Marshyangdi Club for another season. In 2012, he moved to the Three Star Club where he plays now.

== National career ==
Khadka has played for Nepal at the 2009 Nehru Cup, AFC Challenge Cup Quantifying, 2011 SAFF Championship, and the 2012 AFC Challenge Cup. He has also represented his country 4 times in world cup qualifying.

=== International goals ===
Scores and results list Nepal's goal tally first.

| No. | Date | Venue | Opponent | Score | Result | Competition |
|---|---|---|---|---|---|---|
| 1. | 6 September 2018 | Bangabandhu National Stadium, Dhaka, Bangladesh | Bhutan | 4–0 | 4–0 | 2018 SAFF SUZUKI Championship |
