= Biraj Maharjan =

Nepalese footballer

Personal information
- Full name: Biraj Maharjan
- Date of birth: 18 September 1990 (age 36)
- Place of birth: Tripureswor, Nepal
- Height: 1.76 m (5 ft 9 in)
- Position: Full-back

Team information
- Current team: Sporting Ilam De Mechi FC

Youth career
- ANFA Academy

Senior career*
| Years | Team | Apps | (Gls) |
| 2007–2016 | Three Star Club | 98 | (11) |
| 2016–2019 | Manang Marshyangdi Club | | |
| 2019–2020 | Machhindra F.C. | | |
| 2021 | Butwal Lumbini F.C. | | |
| 2021 | Chyasal Youth Club | | |

International career
| 2008–2021 | Nepal | 74 | (1) |
- * Club domestic league appearances and goals

Biraj Maharjan (Nepali: बिराज महर्जन; born 18 September 1990) is a Nepalese former professional footballer. He made his first appearance for the Nepal national football team in 2008.

== Career ==
Biraj Maharjan is a Nepalese defender who, after graduating from ANFA Academy, joined the Three Star Club in 2007. Despite being a defender, he can shoot with both feet and has scored 11 domestic goals.

== International career ==
Maharjan made his national team debut on 25 March 2008 in a friendly match, in which Nepal won 1–0 against Pakistan in Pokhara, Kaski. On 31 August 2015, he won his 50th cap for Nepal national football team in a friendly match against India. He is the most capped player for Nepal national football team. He made his last appearance in Nepal jersey on 29 March 2021 at Dasharath Rangasala, Kathmandu in which Nepal beat Bangladesh by 2 goal in finals of Three Nations Cup.

== Honours ==
=== Country ===
- Bangabandhu Gold Cup
  - winner:2016
- AFC Solidarity Cup
  - winner:2016
- Three Nations Cup
  - winner:2021

=== Club ===
Three Star Club

- Martyr's Memorial A-Division League
  - winner:2012-13

Manang Marshyangdi Club

- Martyr's Memorial A-Division League
  - winner:2018-19

Machhindra F.C.

- Martyr's Memorial A-Division League
  - winner:2019-20
