= Raju Tamang =

Nepalese footballer

Personal information
- Full name: Raju Tamang
- Date of birth: October 27, 1985 (age 41)
- Position: Midfielder

Team information
- Current team: Tribhuvan Army Club Women (head coach)

Senior career*
Years	Team	Apps	(Gls)
2004–	Tribhuvan Army Club		

International career
2005–	Nepal	35	(2)

Managerial career
- 2026–: Tribhuvan Army Club Women
- * Club domestic league appearances and goals

Raju Tamang (Nepali: राजु तामाङ; born 27 October 1985) is a Nepalese football coach and former footballer. He played for the departmental team Nepal Army Club in Martyr's Memorial A-Division League. He is currently serving as the head coach of the Tribhuvan Army Women's Club.

== International ==
He made his first appearance for the Nepal national football team in 2005. During the 2014 AFC Challenge Cup qualification Tamand converted a Penalty kick for Nepal in a 6–0 rout over Northern Mariana Islands national football team after teammate Jagajeet Shrestha was fouled in the box.

=== International Goals ===
#	Date	Venue	Opponent	Score	Result	Competition
1	2 March 2013	Dasarath Rangasala Stadium, Kathmandu, Nepal	Northern Mariana Islands	4–0	6–0	2014 AFC Challenge Cup qualification

== Personal life ==
In late August 2011 Tamang was called up by the Nepalese Army to take part in the UN mission in Haiti. Tamang spent six months taking part in the international response to the 2010 Haiti earthquake. Nepal Army Club coach Damber Singh Gurung said that "We will miss him in the league. His role in our team is very important. But it is a system in Nepal Army that every Army [soldier] gets this opportunity to take part in UN Mission." In addition to missing many league games with his club Tamang also missed the FIFA World Cup Qualifier matches against Timor-Leste.

== Controversy ==
In March 2012 the Nepal Army Club would not allow Tamang and teammate Bikash Malla to take part in the 2012 AFC Challenge Cup on home soil, as the two were to take part in the Southeast Asian army games also hosted by Nepal. Tamang and Malla were forced to leave the Nepalese team in mid-training, infuriating then coach Graham Roberts.

== Awards ==
- ANFA Player of the year's 2016.
