= Bhola Silwal =

Nepalese footballer

Personal information
- Full name: Bhola Nath Silwal
- Date of birth: 4 January 1987 (age 39)
- Place of birth: Biratnagar, Nepal
- Position: Midfielder

Team information
- Current team: Nepal Police Club
- Number: 17

Senior career*
Years	Team	Apps	(Gls)
2005–	Nepal Police Club		

International career^{‡}
2008–	Nepal	26	(2)

Managerial career
- 2024–: Nepal Police FC
- * Club domestic league appearances and goals as of Nepal police club ‡ National team caps and goals as of 18 March 2013

Bhola Nath Silwal (Nepali: भोला सिलवाल) (born 4 January 1987 in Biratnagar, Nepal) is a Nepali professional footballer, who plays for Nepal Police Club in the Martyr's Memorial A-Division League as a midfielder. He debuted for the Nepal national football team during the 2014 FIFA World Cup qualifiers.

== International career ==
Silwal scored the tying goal for Nepal in a 1–1 draw with Bangladesh on 20 September 2012.

=== International goals ===
Scores and results list Nepal's goal tally first.

#	Date	Venue	Opponent	Score	Result	Competition
1.	20 September 2012	Dasarath Rangasala Stadium, Kathmandu	Bangladesh	1–1	1–1	friendly match

== Personal life ==
On 6 June 2015 Silwal was married with Elyaza Acharya.
