= Sagar Thapa =

Nepalese footballer

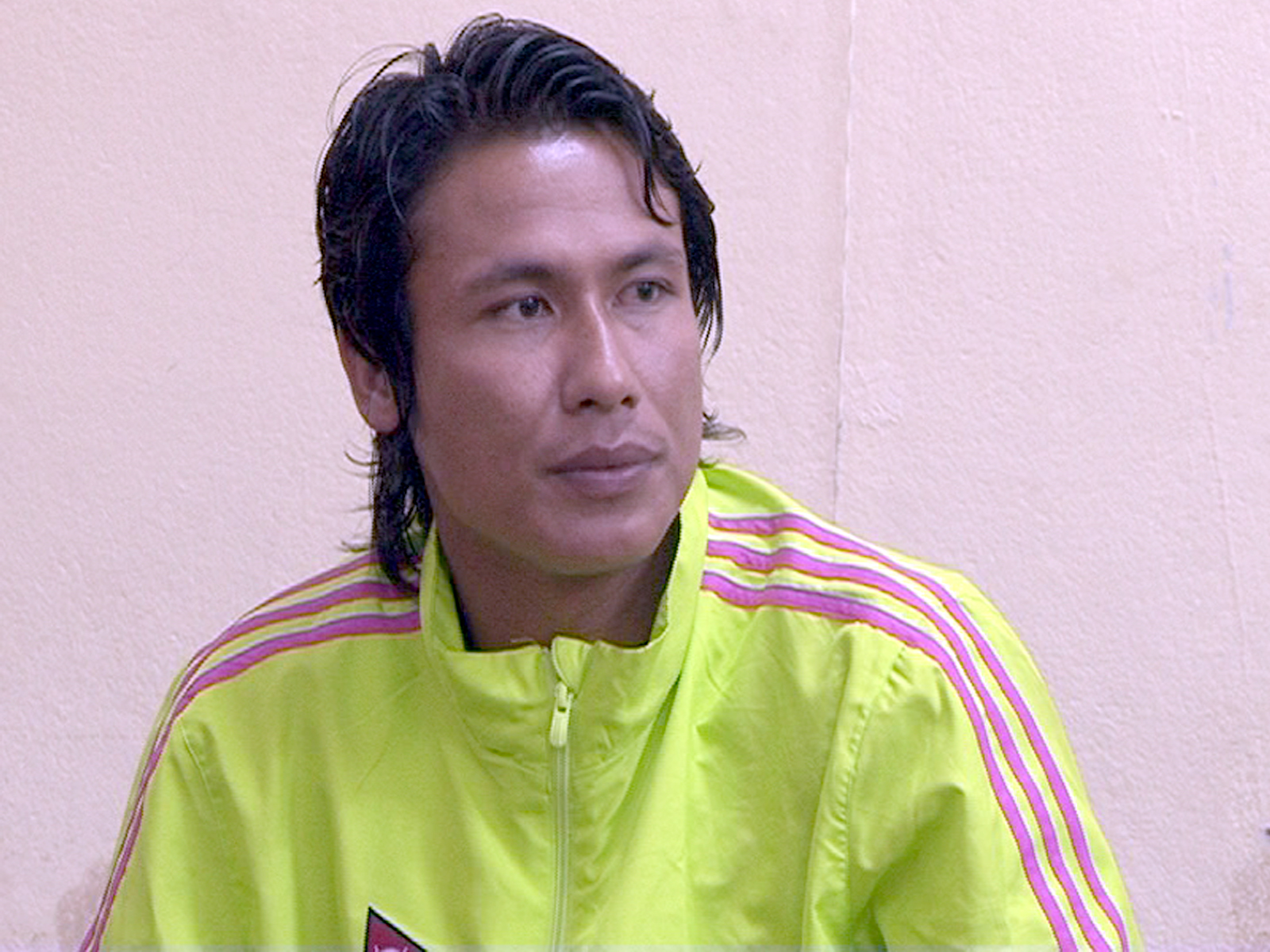

Personal information
- Full name: Sagar Thapa
- Date of birth: 21 November 1985 (age 41)
- Place of birth: Machhegaun, Nepal
- Height: 1.76 m (5 ft 9 in)
- Position: Defender

Senior career*
Years	Team	Apps	(Gls)
–2012	Himalayan Sherpa Club		
2012–2013	Friends Club		
2014–2015	Manang Marshyangdi Club		
2015–	Three Star Club		

International career
2003–2015	Nepal	66	(1)
- * Club domestic league appearances and goals

Sagar Thapa is a former Nepalese footballer and the former captain of the Nepal national team. Known for his strong defensive skills, he played a crucial role in Nepal’s international football scene. Thapa represented Nepal in various tournaments, contributing significantly to the team’s performances over the years.

== Early life ==
Thapa was born in the village of Machhegaun in Kathmandu District, although he spent most of childhood in Dharan and Biratnagar. When he was in eight grade, Thapa was offered a scholarship by the Daffodil School of Kathmandu. In 2001, at the age of 17, Thapa joined Friends Club. Initially he played as a forward and midfielder but after a being offered a vacant spot in central defense, Thapa made the position his own.

== Career ==
=== Yeti Himalayan Sherpa Club ===
Thapa started his career at the Himalayan Sherpa Club. His contract expired in 2012, but his decision to leave his club was heavily scrutinized in the media. The main reason why he left was because he felt that the salary of 50,000 rupees per month wasn't good enough, demanding that he and other prominent Nepali footballers should be paid 1 Lakh (or 100,000 rupees) per month.

=== Manang Marshyangdi Club ===
Thapa captained and played for Manang Marshyangdi Club in the domestic league. He also helped Manang Marshyangdi Club clinch A Division League in 2014. He was previously playing for Friends Club. He took the role of interim coach for Friends Club after their coach Dilkaji Gurung resigned.

Nepali National Football team captain Sagar Thapa has been declared player of the year. All Nepal Football Association ( ANFA ) made such declaration amid a press conference in the Capital on Friday. On the occasion, ANFA awarded an apartment to Thapa. Receiving the award, Thapa said such honor for players have bestowed more responsibility upon them.

In January 2015 Thapa announced that he was leaving Manang Marshyangdi after a dispute over his salary.

=== Three Star Club ===
Latter that month it was announced that Thapa had signed with Three Star Club for the upcoming 2014–15 Martyr's Memorial A-Division League. On 1 October 2015 Thapa scored his first goal for the club with a well placed free-kick in the thirty-eight minute against Nepal Army Club. Thapa however received significant criticism in the same match as he insulted and yelled at referee Sharwan Lama after the latter had issued Thapa a yellow card. In the aftermath Thapa was suspended two games while Nepal Army Megh Raj KC was suspended for his out burst directed at the referee. Sharwan Lama was also penalized for not properly handling the incident.

== International career ==
Thapa made his international debut in a 2004 AFC Asian Cup qualification match against Vietnam in 2003. Thapa became the permanent captain for his country during the 2010 AFC Challenge Cup. He is one of the most capped Nepalese footballers of all time with more than 50 appearances to his name. Perhaps his most famous moment for the national team was the last minute goal he scored from a free-kick during the 2011 SAFF Championship against Bangladesh that reminded many of Ronaldinho's memorable strikes.

=== International goals ===
Scores and results list Nepal's goal tally first.

#	Date	Venue	Opponent	Score	Result	Competition	Reference
1.	4 December 2011	Jawaharlal Nehru Stadium, New Delhi	Bangladesh	1–0	1–0	2011 SAFF Championship	

== Personal life ==
Thapa is married, with two children.

== Match fixing allegations ==
In 2015, Sagar Thapa and several teammates faced allegations of match-fixing. However, in 2018, Nepal’s Special Court acquitted Thapa and his teammates due to a lack of sufficient evidence. The Supreme Court of Nepal upheld this acquittal in 2020, confirming that there was no legal basis for the charges. Despite this, the Asian Football Confederation (AFC) imposed a lifetime ban, which Thapa and his colleagues have expressed intentions to challenge.
