= Syria national football team results (2000–2009) =

This is a list of official football games played by Syria national football team between 2000 and 2009.

== 2000 ==
31 March 2000 2000 Asian Cup Q	Syria	1–0	Bahrain	Aleppo, Syria
	Taleb 64'			Stadium: Al-Hamadaniah Stadium

2 April 2000 2000 Asian Cup Q	Syria	0–1	Iran	Aleppo, Syria
			Daei 55'	Stadium: Al-Hamadaniah Stadium

4 April 2000 2000 Asian Cup Q	Syria	6–0	Maldives	Aleppo, Syria
	Abaza 10'; Azzam 12'; Srour 30'; Al-Basha 50'; Hamami 70'; A. John 92' (o.g.)			Stadium: Al-Hamadaniah Stadium

7 April 2000 2000 Asian Cup Q	Maldives	1–2	Syria	Tehran, Iran
	Latheef 90'		Al Zaher 10'; Kordieh 33'	Stadium: Azadi Stadium

9 April 2000 2000 Asian Cup Q	Iran	1–1	Syria	Tehran, Iran
	Hasheminasab 40'		Al Sayed 15'	Stadium: Azadi Stadium

11 April 2000 2000 Asian Cup Q	Bahrain	0–1	Syria	Tehran, Iran
			Haj Moustafa 24'	Stadium: Azadi Stadium

24 May 2000 2000 WAFF Championship	Palestine	0–1	Syria	Amman, Jordan
20:30			Al Bitar 80'	Stadium: King Abdullah II Stadium

26 May 2000 2000 WAFF Championship	Kazakhstan	0–4	Syria	Amman, Jordan
17:30			Azzam 26'; Boushi 56'; Haj Moustafa 57'; Al Bitar 82'	Stadium: King Abdullah II Stadium

28 May 2000 2000 WAFF Championship	Iran	1–0	Syria	Amman, Jordan
20:30	Karimi 60' (pen.)			Stadium: King Abdullah II Stadium

31 May 2000 2000 WAFF Championship	Syria	0–0 (a.e.t.) (5–3 p)	Iraq	Amman, Jordan
17:30				Stadium: King Abdullah II Stadium

3 June 2000 2000 WAFF Championship	Iran	1–0	Syria	Amman, Jordan
20:30	Bakhtiarizadeh 36'			Stadium: King Abdullah II Stadium

== 2001 ==
30 April 2001 2002 WCQ	Syria	12–0	Philippines	Aleppo, Syria

4 May 2001 2002 WCQ	Syria	5–1	Philippines	Aleppo, Syria

7 May 2001 2002 WCQ	Syria	11–0	Laos	Aleppo, Syria

9 May 2001 2002 WCQ	Laos	0–9	Syria	Aleppo, Syria

18 May 2001 2002 WCQ	Syria	3–3	Oman	Aleppo, Syria

25 May 2001 2002 WCQ	Oman	2–0	Syria	Muscat, Oman

== 2002 ==
19 July 2002 Friendly	Iraq	2–0	Syria	Iraq

22 July 2002 Friendly	Iraq	2–1	Syria	Iraq

30 August 2002 2002 WAFF Championship	Syria	2–1	Palestine	Damascus, Syria
				Stadium: Abbasiyyin Stadium

3 September 2002 2002 WAFF Championship	Iraq	1–0	Syria	Damascus, Syria
				Stadium: Abbasiyyin Stadium

5 September 2002 2002 WAFF Championship	Jordan	2–1 (a.e.t.)	Syria	Damascus, Syria
				Stadium: Abbasiyyin Stadium

7 September 2002 2002 WAFF Championship	Iran	2–2	Syria	Damascus, Syria
				Stadium: Abbasiyyin Stadium

17 December 2002 2002 Arab Nations Cup	Yemen	0–4	Syria	Kuwait City, Kuwait
				Stadium: Al Kuwait Sports Club Stadium

19 December 2002 2002 Arab Nations Cup	Bahrain	2–0	Syria	Kuwait City, Kuwait
				Stadium: Al Kuwait Sports Club Stadium

21 December 2002 2002 Arab Nations Cup	Syria	4–1	Lebanon	Kuwait City, Kuwait
				Stadium: Al Kuwait Sports Club Stadium

24 December 2002 2002 Arab Nations Cup	Syria	0–3	Saudi Arabia	Kuwait City, Kuwait
				Stadium: Al Kuwait Sports Club Stadium

== 2003 ==
15 October 2003 2004 Asian Cup Q	Syria	5–0	Sri Lanka	Damascus, Syria
	Mando 34', 82'; Al-Sayed 54', 84'; Al-Khatib 73'

18 October 2003 2004 Asian Cup Q	Sri Lanka	0–8	Syria	Damascus, Syria
			Al-Khatib 40', 49', 55'; Al-Sayed 45', 65'; Mando 60'; Al Shahmeh 80', 83'

7 November 2003 2004 Asian Cup Q	Syria	1–3	United Arab Emirates	Damascus, Syria
	Al-Khatib 50'		Yaslam 74'; Srour 80'; Jumaa 89'

14 November 2003 2004 Asian Cup Q	United Arab Emirates	3–1	Syria	Sharjah, United Arab Emirates
	Yaslam 45'; Omar 63'; Rashed 78'		Rafe 36'

28 November 2003 2004 Asian Cup Q	Syria	1–1	Turkmenistan	Damascus, Syria
	Sari 10'		Urazow 16'

3 December 2003 2004 Asian Cup Q	Turkmenistan	3–0; Awarded	Syria	Ashgabat, Turkmenistan

== 2004 ==
18 February 2004 2006 WCQ	Bahrain	2–1	Syria	Arad, Bahrain

26 March 2004 Friendly	Syria	1–1	Palestine	Damascus, Syria
	Al-Khatib 31'		Al-Hassan 53' (pen.)	Stadium: Al-Jalaa Stadium

31 March 2004 2006 WCQ	Kyrgyzstan	1–1	Syria	Bishkek, Kyrgyzstan

10 June 2004 2006 WCQ	Syria	2–1	Tajikistan	Homs, Syria

8 September 2004 2006 WCQ	Tajikistan	0–1	Syria	Dushanbe, Tajikistan

19 June 2004 2004 WAFF Championship	Syria	3–1	Lebanon	Tehran, Iran
				Stadium: Azadi Stadium

21 June 2004 2004 WAFF Championship	Syria	1–7	Iran	Tehran, Iran
				Stadium: Azadi Stadium

23 June 2004 2004 WAFF Championship	Jordan	1–1 (a.e.t.)	Syria	Tehran, Iran
				Stadium: Azadi Stadium

25 June 2004 2004 WAFF Championship	Iran	4–1	Syria	Tehran, Iran
				Stadium: Azadi Stadium

13 October 2004 2006 WCQ	Syria	2–2	Bahrain	Damascus, Syria

17 November 2004 2006 WCQ	Syria	0–1	Kyrgyzstan	Damascus, Syria

== 2005 ==
26 January 2005 Friendly	Kuwait	3–2	Syria	Kuwait

2 February 2005 Friendly	Japan	3–0	Syria	Saitama, Japan
	Suzuki 44'; Miyamoto 69'; Ogasawara 90'			Stadium: Saitama Stadium 2002

25 October 2005 Friendly	Oman	0–0	Syria	Oman

16 November 2005 Friendly	Syria	0–3	United Arab Emirates	Qatar

== 2006 ==
7 February 2006 Friendly	Syria	3–0	Palestine	Damascus, Syria
				Stadium: Abbasiyyin Stadium

22 February 2006 2007 Asian Cup Q	Syria	1–2	South Korea	Aleppo, Syria

1 March 2006 2007 Asian Cup Q	Chinese Taipei	0–4	Syria	Taipei, Taiwan

16 August 2006 2007 Asian Cup Q	Iran	1–1	Syria	Tehran, Iran

6 September 2006 2007 Asian Cup Q	Syria	0–2	Iran	Damascus, Syria

11 October 2006 2007 Asian Cup Q	South Korea	1–1	Syria	Seoul, South Korea

15 November 2006 2007 Asian Cup Q	Syria	3–0	Chinese Taipei	Damascus, Syria

== 2007 ==
16 June 2007 2007 WAFF Championship	Lebanon	0–1	Syria	Amman, Jordan
				Stadium: Amman International Stadium

18 June 2007 2007 WAFF Championship	Jordan	0–1	Syria	Amman, Jordan
				Stadium: Amman International Stadium

22 June 2007 2007 WAFF Championship	Syria	0–3	Iraq	Amman, Jordan
				Stadium: Amman International Stadium

8 October 2007 2010 WCQ	Syria	3–0	Afghanistan	Damascus, Syria
				Stadium: Abbasiyyin Stadium

26 October 2007 2010 WCQ	Afghanistan	1–2	Syria	Dushanbe, Tajikistan
				Stadium: Pamir Stadium

9 November 2007 2010 WCQ	Indonesia	1–4	Syria	Jakarta, Indonesia
				Stadium: Gelora Bung Karno Stadium

18 November 2007 2010 WCQ	Syria	7–0	Indonesia	Damascus, Syria
				Stadium: Abbasiyyin Stadium

== 2008 ==
6 February 2008 2010 WCQ	Iran	0–0	Syria	Tehran, Iran
				Stadium: Azadi Stadium

26 March 2008 2010 WCQ	Syria	1–1	United Arab Emirates	Damascus, Syria
				Stadium: Abbasiyyin Stadium

2 June 2008 2010 WCQ	Syria	1–0	Kuwait	Damascus, Syria
				Stadium: Abbasiyyin Stadium

8 June 2008 2010 WCQ	Kuwait	4–2	Syria	Salmiya, Kuwait
				Stadium: Thamir Stadium

14 June 2008 2010 WCQ	Syria	0–2	Iran	Damascus, Syria
				Stadium: Abbasiyyin Stadium

22 June 2008 2010 WCQ	United Arab Emirates	1–3	Syria	Al Ain, United Arab Emirates
				Stadium: Tahnoun bin Mohammed Stadium

7 August 2008 2008 WAFF Championship	Syria	0–0	Jordan	Tehran, Iran
				Stadium: Takhti Stadium

9 August 2008 2008 WAFF Championship	Oman	1–2	Syria	Tehran, Iran
				Stadium: Takhti Stadium

13 August 2008 2008 WAFF Championship	Iran	2–0	Syria	Tehran, Iran
				Stadium: Takhti Stadium

21 August 2008 Friendly	Venezuela	4–1	Syria	Puerto la Cruz, Venezuela
02:40 UTC+4				Stadium: Estadio José Antonio Anzoátegui

== 2009 ==
14 January 2009 2011 Asian Cup Q	Syria	3–2	China	Aleppo, Syria
14:00 UTC+2	Al Sayed 8' (pen.), 24'; Al Khatib 39' (pen.)		Qu Bo 51'; Liu Jian 90+4'	Stadium: Aleppo International Stadium; Attendance: 7,000; Referee: Mohsen Torky (Iran)

28 January 2009 2011 Asian Cup Q	Lebanon	0–2	Syria	Sidon, Lebanon
17:00 UTC+2			J. Al Hussain 37'; Al Khatib 78'	Stadium: Saida Municipal Stadium; Attendance: 300; Referee: Abdullah Balideh (Qatar)

1 February 2009 Friendly	Syria	1–1	South Korea	Dubai, United Arab Emirates

21 March 2009 Friendly	Syria	1–2	Qatar	Aleppo, Syria
	al-Haj 79'		Soria 56', 74'	Stadium: Aleppo International Stadium

20 August 2009 2009 Nehru Cup	Syria	2–0	Kyrgyzstan	New Delhi, India
18:30 IST	Al Zeno 9'; Al Agha 72'			Stadium: Ambedkar Stadium; Referee: Pratap Singh (India)

24 August 2009 2009 Nehru Cup	Syria	4–0	Sri Lanka	New Delhi, India
18:30 IST	Al Zeno 26'; Al Hussain 33'; Al Agha 37', 55'			Stadium: Ambedkar Stadium; Referee: Pratap Singh (India)

27 August 2009 2009 Nehru Cup	Syria	1–0	Lebanon	New Delhi, India
18:30 IST	Al Zeno 23'			Stadium: Ambedkar Stadium; Referee: Rowan Arumughan (India)

29 August 2009 2009 Nehru Cup	India	0–1	Syria	New Delhi, India
18:30 IST			Diab 18'	Stadium: Ambedkar Stadium; Referee: Ali Adil (Maldives)

31 August 2009 2009 Nehru Cup	Syria	1–1 (a.e.t.) (4–5 p)	India	New Delhi, India
18:30 IST	Diab 120+3'		Renedy 114'	Stadium: Ambedkar Stadium; Attendance: 35,000; Referee: Ali Adil (Maldives)
	Penalties
	Rafe (penalty scored); Ayan (penalty missed); Haj Mohamad (penalty missed); Balhous (penalty scored); Al Agha (penalty scored); Al Hussain (penalty scored); Al Aitoni (penalty missed)		(penalty scored) Lawrence; (penalty missed) Renedy; (penalty scored) Chhetri; (penalty scored) Dias; (penalty missed) Wadoo; (penalty scored) A. Ali; (penalty scored) Surkumar

14 November 2009 2011 AFC Asian Cup qualification	Vietnam	0–1	Syria	Hanoi, Vietnam
			Rafe 90+4'	Stadium: Mỹ Đình National Stadium; Attendance: 30,000; Referee: Ben Williams (Australia)

18 November 2009 2011 AFC Asian Cup qualification	Syria	0–0	Vietnam	Aleppo, Syria
				Stadium: Aleppo International Stadium; Attendance: 19,000; Referee: Abdullah Al Hilali (Oman)

30 December 2009 Friendly	Malaysia	4–1	Syria	Kuala Lumpur, Malaysia
20:45 UTC+8	Safiq Rahim 31' (pen.) 63' (pen.); Zaquan Adha 77'; K. Gurusamy 90'	Report	Omar Hemidi 68' (pen.)	Stadium: National Stadium, Bukit Jalil
