= 2009 Nehru Cup =

2009 ONGC Nehru Cup

Tournament details
- Host country: India
- Dates: 19–31 August
- Teams: 5 (from 1 confederation)
- Venue: 1 (in 1 host city)

Final positions
- Champions: India (2nd title)
- Runners-up: Syria

Tournament statistics
- Matches played: 11
- Goals scored: 32 (2.91 per match)
- Top scorer(s): (Sri Lanka) Mohamed Izzadeen (Syria) Abdul Fattah Al Agha (Syria) Mohamed Al Zeno (3 goals)
- Best player: (India) Baichung Bhutia

The 2009 Nehru Cup International Football Tournament also known as the ONGC Nehru Cup due to the competition's sponsorship by ONGC, was the 14th edition of the Nehru Cup a friendly tournament organized by the All India Football Federation (AIFF).

The 14th edition of the Nehru Cup International Football Tournament was played in the round-robin league format and the final was held on 31 August. Along with the host nation India, Sri Lanka, Lebanon, Syria and Kyrgyzstan competed in the 15-day tournament at the Ambedkar Stadium in New Delhi .

The total prize money for this tournament was $100,000. The champion team took away a prize of $40,000, the runners-up received $20,000 while the third place team got $10,000. The Man of the Match received $500 and the winning team of every match received $2000.

All games of the tournament was broadcast live by Zee Sports.

== Teams ==
- Initially the tournament was due to be played by 6 national teams divided into two groups of three teams. The top two in each group would advance to the semi-final stage. Palestine replaced Thailand before being removed from the tournament themselves after they stated their intention to send a reserve side.

=== Expected Groups ===
Group A	Group B
India (Hosts and holders); Lebanon	Syria (Runners-up last Tournament); Kyrgyzstan; Sri Lanka

=== Revised Group ===
Due to only 5 teams entering, only one group was needed, where each team would play in a round robin group phase. The top two advanced to a final.

The Teams	India (Hosts and holders); Lebanon; Syria (Runners-up last Tournament); Kyrgyzstan; Sri Lanka

== Squads ==
India
No.	Name	Club	Appearances		Goals
No.	Name	Club	Start	Sub	Goals
Goalkeepers
1	Subrata Pal	(India) Pune FC	5	0	0
24	Subhasish Roy Chowdhary	(India) Mahindra United	0	0	0
Defenders
3	Nanjangud Shivananju Manju	(India) Mohun Bagan	1	0	0
5	Anwar Ali	(India) Dempo	5	0	0
12	Deepak Kumar Mondal	(India) Mohun Bagan	2	0	0
14	Mahesh Gawli	(India) Dempo	4	1	0
17	Irungbam Surkumar Singh	(India) Salgaocar SC	3	0	0
19	Gouramangi Singh	(India) Churchill Brothers	5	0	1
20	Samir Subash Naik	(India) Dempo	0	0	0
Midfielders
7	N.P. Pradeep	(India) Mahindra United	4	1	0
8	P. Renedy Singh	(India) East Bengal	1	3	1
22	Syed Rahim Nabi	(India) East Bengal	1	1	0
23	Steven Dias	(India) Mahindra United	4	1	1
27	Mehrajuddin Wadoo	(India) East Bengal	1	4	0
28	Anthony Pereira	(India) Dempo	4	0	0
30	Climax Lawrence	(India) Dempo	5	0	0
Strikers
11	Sunil Chhetri	(India) Dempo, (United States) Kansas City Wizards	3	2	1
15	Baichung Bhutia	(India) East Bengal	4	0	2
18	Sushil Kumar Singh	(India) Mahindra United	2	1	0
21	Abhishek Yadav	(India) Mumbai	1	0	0

Kyrgyzstan
No.	Name	Club	Appearances		Goals
No.	Name	Club	Start	Sub	Goals
Goalkeepers
1	Pavel Matiash	(Kyrgyzstan) Dordoi-Dynamo Naryn	3	0	0
16	Maksim Agapov	(Kyrgyzstan) Abdish-Ata Kant	1	0	0
Defenders
2	Sergey Chikishev	(Kyrgyzstan) Sher-Ak-Dan Bishkek	4	0	0
5	Rustamjan Zakirov	(Kyrgyzstan) Abdish-Ata Kant	0	0	0
6	Faruh Abitov	(Kyrgyzstan) Dordoi-Dynamo Naryn	3	0	0
19	Roman Ablakimov	(Kyrgyzstan) Abdish-Ata Kant	2	0	0
28	Rustem Usanov	(Kyrgyzstan) Abdish-Ata Kant	4	0	1
	Vyacheslav Amin	(Kyrgyzstan) Abdish-Ata Kant	0	0	0
Midfielders
3	Vladimir Kasian	(Kyrgyzstan) Abdish-Ata Kant	1	3	0
9	Sergey Kaleutin	(Kyrgyzstan) Abdish-Ata Kant	4	0	0
13	Davron Askarov	(Kyrgyzstan) Abdish-Ata Kant	3	1	0
14	Vadim Harchenko	(Kyrgyzstan) Dordoi-Dynamo Naryn	4	0	0
15	Aibek Bokoev	(Kyrgyzstan) Abdish-Ata Kant	3	0	0
17	Ildar Amirov	(Kyrgyzstan) Dordoi-Dynamo Naryn	4	0	1
22	Pavel Sidorenko	(Kyrgyzstan) Abdish-Ata Kant	0	3	0
25	Artem Muladjanov	(Kyrgyzstan) Dordoi-Dynamo Naryn	0	1	0
	Hurshil Lutfullaev	(Kyrgyzstan) Abdish-Ata Kant	0	0	0
	Aibek Orozaliev	(Kyrgyzstan) Sher-Ak-Dan Bishkek	0	0	0
Strikers
7	Anton Zemlianuhin	(Kyrgyzstan) Abdish-Ata Kant	4	0	2
8	Almazbek Mirzaliev	(Kyrgyzstan) Abdish-Ata Kant	3	1	0
10	Mirlan Murzaev	(Kyrgyzstan) Dordoi-Dynamo Naryn	1	3	2
20	Islam Shamshiev	(Kyrgyzstan) Dordoi-Dynamo Naryn	0	0	0

Lebanon
No.	Name	Club	Appearances		Goals
No.	Name	Club	Start	Sub	Goals
Goalkeepers
1	Larry Mehanna	(Lebanon) Al-Ansar	2	0	0
21	Elias Frejie	(Lebanon) Al-Nejmeh	2	0	0
Defenders
2	Ali Al Saadi	(Lebanon) Safa Beirut	4	0	2
3	Ahmad Khodor	(Lebanon) Al-Ansar	0	0	0
4	Hussein Amine	(Lebanon) Al-Ansar	1	1	0
5	Hassan Daher	(Lebanon) Shabab Al-Sahel	0	0	0
6	Ali El Atat	(Lebanon) Al-Mabarrah	3	0	0
19	Ali Hamam	(Lebanon) Al-Nejmeh	4	0	0
24	Bilal Najjarin	(Lebanon) Al-Nejmeh	4	0	0
Midfielders
7	Hassan Maatouk	(Lebanon) Al Ahed	4	0	0
8	Mohamad Korhani	(Lebanon) Safa Beirut	4	0	1
9	Hussein Dakik	(Lebanon) Al Ahed	0	3	0
10	Abbas Atwi	(Lebanon) Al-Nejmeh	2	0	1
13	Akram Moghrabi	(Lebanon) Al-Nejmeh	2	0	1
14	Amer Khan	(Lebanon) Safa Beirut	1	3	0
15	Ali Yaacoub	(Lebanon) Al-Nejmeh	4	0	0
16	Mahmoud Baquir Younes	(Lebanon) Al-Ansar	0	2	0
Strikers
17	Mahmoud El Ali	(Lebanon) Al Ahed	4	0	0
18	Hamze Abboud	(Lebanon) Safa Beirut	2	0	0
22	Mohammed Ghaddar	(Lebanon) Al-Nejmeh	1	0	0

Sri Lanka
No.	Name	Club	Appearances		Goals
No.	Name	Club	Start	Sub	Goals
Goalkeepers
1	Viraj Asanka	(Sri Lanka) Saunders Sports Club	1	0	0
21	H. M. A. Kumara	Sri Lanka Navy Sports Club	3	0	0
Defenders
2	R. N. A. M. A. B. Warakagoda	Sri Lanka Army Sports Club	4	0	0
4	Well Don Ruwanthilaka	(Sri Lanka) Saunders Sports Club	4	0	1
5	H. A. D. W. Hettiarachchi	(Sri Lanka) Saunders Sports Club	3	0	0
8	Amarasinghe Pradeep Kumara	Sri Lanka Police Sports Club	1	0	0
16	S. K. Lahiru Tharaka Silva	(Sri Lanka) Don Bosco Sports Club	0	0	0
19	Ramlan Tuwan Gafoor Raheem	Sri Lanka Air Force Sports Club	4	0	0
	K. M. T. N. Kumara	Sri Lanka Air Force Sports Club	0	0	0
	K. L. K. C. Kumara	Sri Lanka Air Force Sports Club	0	0	0
Midfielders
7	Chatura Maduranga	(Sri Lanka) Ratnam Sports Club	4	0	2
14	Asmeer Lathif Mohamed	(Sri Lanka) Blue Star SC	4	0	0
17	Warnakulasuriya Rangana	(Sri Lanka) Ratnam Sports Club	0	4	0
20	B. A. R. Jayawila	Sri Lanka Police Sports Club	1	0	0
25	Wella Gunaratne	(Sri Lanka) Don Bosco Sports Club	4	0	0
33	Mohamed Rawme Mohideen	(Sri Lanka) Ratnam Sports Club	3	1	0
	K. N. C. Fernando	Sri Lanka Navy Sports Club	0	0	0
Strikers
6	Mohamed Izzadeen	Sri Lanka Army Sports Club	4	0	3
9	S. Sanjeev	Sri Lanka Air Force Sports Club	0	0	0
10	Ediri Bandalage Channa	(Sri Lanka) Ratnam Sports Club	4	0	0
11	S. Satheeswaran	(Sri Lanka) Premier Sports Club	0	2	0
18	R. M. J. D. Rathnayake	Sri Lanka Navy Sports Club	0	1	0

Syria
No.	Name	Club	Appearances		Goals
No.	Name	Club	Start	Sub	Goals
Goalkeepers
1	Mosab Balhous	(Syria) Al-Karamah	4	0	0
22	Moustafa Shakosh	(Syria) Teshrin SC	0	0	0
25	Kawa Hesso	(Syria) Al-Jaish	1	1	0
Defenders
2	Belal Abduldaim	(Syria) Al-Karamah	5	0	0
42	Adib Barakat	(Syria) Teshrin SC	3	1	0
3	Ali Diab	(Syria) Al-Majd	5	0	2
5	Hamzeh Al Aitoni	(Syria) Al-Majd	2	1	0
29	Juan Hesso	(Syria) Al-Jaish	1	3	0
Midfielders
7	Abdelrazaq Al Hussain	(Syria) Al-Jaish	4	1	1
14	Wael Ayan	(Syria) Al-Ittihad	4	0	0
20	Alaa Al Shbli	(Syria) Al-Karamah	3	1	0
23	Feras Esmaeel	(Syria) Al-Karamah	4	1	0
27	Meaataz Kailouni	(Syria) Al-Ittihad	5	0	0
31	Ahmad Haj Mohamad	(Syria) Al-Ittihad	4	1	0
32	Bakri Tarrab	(Syria) Al-Ittihad	3	0	0
Strikers
12	Mohamed Al Zeno	(Syria) Al-Majd	4	1	3
18	Abdul Fattah Al Agha	(Syria) Al-Ittihad	5	0	3
24	Raja Rafe	(Syria) Al-Majd	1	4	0

== Venues ==
New Delhi
Ambedkar Stadium
Capacity: 20,000
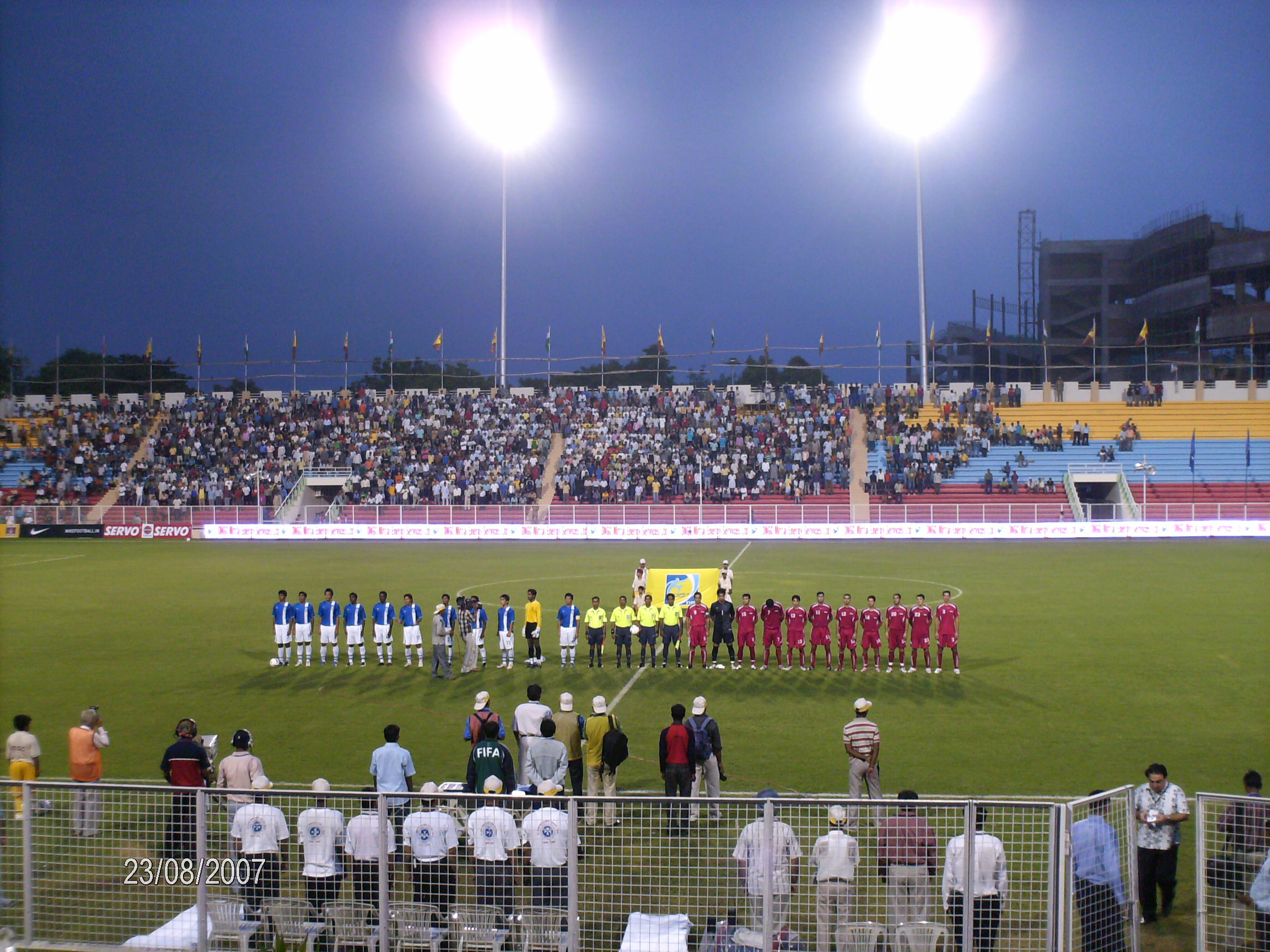

== Matches and results ==
=== Group stage ===
Sri Lankan stiker Mohamed Izzadeen against Lebanon Centre-back Ali Al Saadi during the 3rd match at the Ambedkar Stadium

Teams in green field progress to the Final.

Team	Pld	W	D	L	GF	GA	GD	Pts
Syria	4	4	0	0	8	0	+8	12
India	4	2	0	2	5	4	+1	6
Kyrgyzstan	4	1	1	2	6	6	0	4
Lebanon	4	1	1	2	5	6	−1	4
Sri Lanka	4	1	0	3	6	14	−8	3

Source: RSSSF
19 August 2009
18:30 IST

India	0–1	Lebanon
	Report	Al Saadi 4'

Ambedkar Stadium, New Delhi
Referee: Miron Abdul Hannan (Bangladesh)

20 August 2009
18:30 IST

Syria	2–0	Kyrgyzstan
Al Zeno 9'; Al Agha 72'	Report

Ambedkar Stadium, New Delhi
Referee: Singh (India)

22 August 2009 (Note: The game between Sri Lanka and Lebanon was called off due to heavy rain. The game and thus proceeding schedule was moved back one day.)
18:30 IST

Sri Lanka	4–3	Lebanon
Izzadeen 7', 80', 88'; Maduran Weerasinghe 83'	Report	Moghrabi 9' 45+1'; Korhani 90+7' (pen.)

Ambedkar Stadium, New Delhi
Referee: Arumughan (India)

23 August 2009
18:30 IST

India	2–1	Kyrgyzstan
Bhutia 43'; Chhetri 58' (pen.)	Report	Murzaev 90'

Ambedkar Stadium, New Delhi

24 August 2009
18:30 IST

Syria	4–0	Sri Lanka
Al Zeno 26'; Al Hussain 33'; Al Agha 37', 55'	Report

Ambedkar Stadium, New Delhi
Referee: Singh (India)

25 August 2009
18:30 IST

Kyrgyzstan	1–1	Lebanon
Zemlianuhin 48'	Report	Atwi 56'

Ambedkar Stadium, New Delhi
Referee: Miron Abdul Hannan (Bangladesh)

26 August 2009
18:30 IST

India	3–1	Sri Lanka
Bhutia 25'; Gouramangi 69'; Dias 85'	Report	Dinesh Ruwanthilaka 62'

Ambedkar Stadium, New Delhi
Referee: Ali Adil (Maldives)

27 August 2009
18:30 IST

Syria	1–0	Lebanon
Al Zeno 23'	Report

Ambedkar Stadium, New Delhi
Referee: Arumughan (India)

28 August 2009
18:30 IST

Sri Lanka	1–4	Kyrgyzstan
Chatura Maduranga 53'	Report	Zemlianuhin 34'; Amirov 45+1'; Murzaev 65'; Usanov 70'

Ambedkar Stadium, New Delhi
Referee: Singh (India)

29 August 2009
18:30 IST

India	0–1	Syria
	Report	Diab 18'

Ambedkar Stadium, New Delhi
Referee: Ali Adil (Maldives)

=== Final ===
31 August 2009
18:30 IST

Syria	1–1 (a.e.t.)	India
Diab 120+3'	Report	Renedy 114'
Penalties
Rafe (penalty scored); Ayan (penalty missed); Haj Mohamad (penalty missed); Balhous (penalty scored); Al Agha (penalty scored); Al Hussain (penalty scored); Al Aitoni (penalty missed)	4–5	(penalty scored) Lawrence; (penalty missed) Renedy; (penalty scored) Chhetri; (penalty scored) Dias; (penalty missed) Wadoo; (penalty scored) A. Ali; (penalty scored) Surkumar

Ambedkar Stadium, New Delhi
Attendance: 35,000
Referee: Ali Adil (Maldives)

Syria:
GK	1	Mosab Balhous (c)
DF	2	Belal Abduldaim
DF	3	Ali Diab
DF	5	Hamzeh Al Aitoni	(yellow card) 105+2'
MF	7	Abdelrazaq Al Hussain
MF	14	Wael Ayan
MF	23	Feras Esmaeel
MF	27	Meaataz Kailouni		(substituted off) 83'
MF	32	Bakri Tarrab
FW	12	Mohamed Al Zeno		(substituted off) 70'
FW	18	Abdul Fattah Al Agha
Substitutions:
FW	24	Raja Rafe		(substituted on) 70'
MF	31	Ahmad Haj Mohamad		(substituted on) 83'
Coach:
Fajr Ibrahim (Syria)

India:
GK	1	Subrata Pal
DF	5	Anwar Ali
DF	17	Irungbam Surkumar Singh
DF	14	Mahesh Gawli
DF	19	Gouramangi Singh
MF	7	N.P. Pradeep		(substituted off) 117'
MF	23	Steven Dias
MF	28	Anthony Pereira		(substituted off) 101'
MF	30	Climax Lawrence
FW	11	Sunil Chhetri
FW	15	Baichung Bhutia (c)	(yellow card) 28'
Substitutions:
MF	8	P. Renedy Singh		(substituted on) 101'
MF	27	Mehrajuddin Wadoo		(substituted on) 117'
Coach:
Bob Houghton (England)

== Winners ==
2009 Nehru Cup champion

India
Second title

== Goalscorers ==
3 goals:

- (Sri Lanka) Mohamed Izzadeen
- (Syria) Abdul Fattah Al Agha
- (Syria) Mohamed Al Zeno

2 goals:

- (India) Baichung Bhutia
- (Kyrgyzstan) Mirlan Murzaev
- (Kyrgyzstan) Anton Zemlianuhin
- (Lebanon) Ali Al Saadi
- (Sri Lanka) Chathura Maduranga
- (Syria) Ali Diab

1 goal:

- (India) Sunil Chhetri
- (India) Steven Dias
- (India) Gouramangi Singh
- (India) P. Renedy Singh
- (Kyrgyzstan) Ildar Amirov
- (Kyrgyzstan) Rustem Usanov
- (Lebanon) Abbas Ahmed Atwi
- (Lebanon) Akram Moghrabi
- (Lebanon) Mohamad Korhani
- (Sri Lanka) Dinesh Ruwanthilaka
- (Syria) Abdelrazaq Al Hussain

== Man of the Match ==
- (Lebanon) Ali Al Saadi IND vs LIB
- (Syria) Mohamed Al Zeno SYR vs KGZ
- (Sri Lanka) Mohamed Izzadeen SRI vs LIB
- (India) Baichung Bhutia IND vs KGZ
- (Syria) Abdelrazaq Al Hussain SYR vs SRI
- (Kyrgyzstan) Anton Zemlianuhin KGZ vs LIB
- (India) Baichung Bhutia IND vs SRI
- (Syria) Mohamed Al Zeno SYR vs LIB
- (Kyrgyzstan) Anton Zemlianuhin SRI vs KGZ
- (Syria) Ali Diab IND vs SYR
- (India) Subrata Pal SYR vs IND, Final

== Player of the Tournament ==
- (India) Baichung Bhutia
