= 2008 AFC Challenge Cup final =

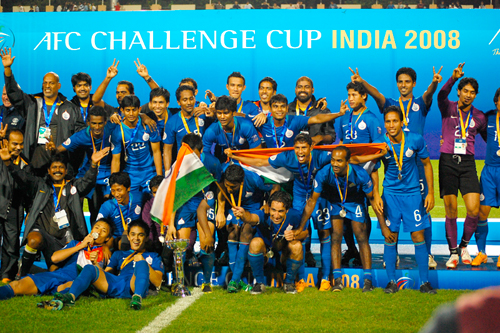
- Indian team celebrating their win
- Event: 2008 AFC Challenge Cup
India	Tajikistan
	(Tajikistan)
4	1
- Date: 13 August 2008
- Venue: Ambedkar Stadium, New Delhi
- Referee: Valentin Kovalenko (Uzbekistan)
- Attendance: 10,000
- Weather: Cloudy and rainy 27 °C (81 °F)

The 2008 AFC Challenge Cup final was a football match that took place on 13 August 2008 at the Ambedkar Stadium in New Delhi to determine the winner of the 2008 AFC Challenge Cup. India defeated title holders Tajikistan in the final by 4–1 and qualified for the 2011 AFC Asian Cup. It was the first time since 1984 that they qualified for a major tournament. Sunil Chhetri scored his first international hat-trick in this match. Indian forward Bhaichung Bhutia scored the other goal meanwhile the lone strike for the Tajiks was by Fatkhullo Fatkhulloyev.

== Background ==
Tajikistan was playing in their second consecutive final and were the defending champions after their win over Sri Lanka in 2006. Dzhomikhon Mukhidinov scored a brace in that match to give Tajiks a resounding 4–0 win over the Lankans, while the remaining goals were scored by Khurshed Makhmudov and Numonjon Hakimov. For India it was their first appearance in a Continental final since the victory over South Korea in 1962 Asian Games final.

== Venue ==
Due to incessant rains in Hyderabad in the days leading up to the final, the AFC changed the venue of the final and the third place play-off to the Ambedkar Stadium in New Delhi.

2008 AFC Challenge Cup final is located in India	New Delhi
2008 AFC Challenge Cup final is located in India	Ambedkar Stadium
2008 AFC Challenge Cup final is located in India	Capacity: 20,000

== Route to the final ==
=== India ===
India qualified directly to the main tournament as the hosts and did not have to play the qualifying rounds. They were placed in the Group A along with Tajikistan, Afghanistan and Turkmenistan national teams. Indians opened their campaign with a narrow 1–0 win over Afghanistan thanks to the stoppage time winner from Climax Lawrence. In the next match they were held to a 1–1 draw by Tajikistan. Tajik striker Yusuf Rabiev broke the deadlock in the 11th minute but goalkeeper Alisher Tuychiev scored an unfortunate own goal in the second-half to ensure the tie ended in a stalemate. The final match of the group stage was a must win against Turkmenistan in order for India to qualify to the semi-finals. Bhaichung Bhutia scored a brace helping his team secure a 2–1 win. The opponents for India in the semi-final was Myanmar and once again secured a narrow 1–0 win with Sunil Chhetri scoring the winner in 82nd minute of the match.

=== Tajikistan ===
For Tajikistan the route to the final was more difficult as they have to play the qualifying rounds in order to reach the main tournament. They were placed in the Group B for the qualifiers along with Bhutan, Brunei and the hosts for the round the Philippines. All the matches were played at Barotac Nuevo Plaza Field in Iloilo City. They defeated Bhutan 3–1 and Brunei by the score of 4–0. The match against Philippines ended in a goalless draw which meant Tajikistan topped their group in qualification stage and progressed to the main competition.

Tajikistan got placed alongside hosts India and their Central Asian neighbours Afghanistan and Turkmenistan in Group A of the main tournament. Their first game ended in a 0–0 draw with Turkmenistan, followed by a one-all draw against India. But in the final match day Tajiks demolished Afghanistan 4–0 and qualified for the semi-final. They faced North Korea in the semi-final and won by a solitary goal scored by Dzhomikhon Mukhidinov six minutes before the end of first half.

India
Round
Tajikistan
Opponent
Result
Qualifying round
Opponent
Result
Automatic qualifier
Automatic qualifier
Match 1
Bhutan
3–1
Match 2
Philippines
0–0
Match 3
Brunei
4–0
Final standing

Team	Pld	W	D	L	GF	GA	GD	Pts
Tajikistan	3	2	1	0	7	1	+6	7
Philippines	3	2	1	0	4	0	+4	7
Bhutan	3	0	1	2	2	7	−5	1
Brunei	3	0	1	2	1	6	−5	1

Source: RSSSF
Opponent
Result
Group stage
Opponent
Result
Afghanistan
1–0
Match 1
Turkmenistan
0–0
Tajikistan
1–1
Match 2
India
1–1
Turkmenistan
2–1
Match 3
Afghanistan
4–0

Team	Pld	W	D	L	GF	GA	GD	Pts
India	3	2	1	0	4	2	+2	7
Tajikistan	3	1	2	0	5	1	+4	5
Turkmenistan	3	1	1	1	6	2	+4	4
Afghanistan	3	0	0	3	0	10	−10	0

Final standing

Team	Pld	W	D	L	GF	GA	GD	Pts
India	3	2	1	0	4	2	+2	7
Tajikistan	3	1	2	0	5	1	+4	5
Turkmenistan	3	1	1	1	6	2	+4	4
Afghanistan	3	0	0	3	0	10	-10	0

Opponent
Result
Knockout phase
Opponent
Result
Myanmar
1–0
Semi-finals
North Korea
1–0

== Match details ==
13 August 2008
19:00 IST

India	4–1	Tajikistan
Chhetri 9', 23', 75'; Bhutia 18'	AIFF	Fatkhuloev 44'

Ambedkar Stadium, New Delhi
Attendance: 10,000
Referee: Valentin Kovalenko (Uzbekistan)

India	Tajikistan

GK	1	Subrata Pal
RB	17	Surkumar Singh Irungbam
CB	19	Gouramangi Singh
CB	5	Anwar Ali
LB	30	Samir Naik	(yellow card) 39'
DM	20	Climax Lawrence
RM	23	Steven Dias		(substituted off) 86'
CM	7	Pappachen Pradeep		(substituted off) 35'
LM	8	Renedy Singh
CF	15	Bhaichung Bhutia (c)		(substituted off) 77'
CF	11	Sunil Chhetri
Substitutes:
DF	2	Govin Singh
MF	4	Krishnan Nair Ajayan
MF	6	Baldeep Singh
DF	12	Deepak Mondal
FW	18	Sushilkumar Singh		(substituted on) 77'
FW	21	Abhishek Yadav
DF	22	Syed Rahim Nabi
GK	24	Subhasish Roy Chowdhury
MF	25	Clifford Miranda		(substituted on) 86'
MF	27	Mehrajuddin Wadoo	(yellow card) 43'	(substituted on) 35'
MF	28	Thomchok Singh Bungo
Head Coach:
(England) Bob Houghton

GK	1	Alisher Tuychiev
DF	2	Daler Tukhtasunov
DF	3	Naim Nasirov (substituted off) 62'
DF	6	Davron Ergashev
MF	9	Anvar Norkulov
FW	11	Numonjon Hakimov (substituted off) 75'
DF	12	Eraj Rajabov
DF	17	Sokhib Suvonkulov (yellow card) 46'
MF	18	Fatkhullo Fatkhuloev (yellow card) 43'
FW	19	Dzhomikhon Mukhidinov
MF	22	Yusuf Rabiev (c)
Substitutes:
MF	14	Samad Shohzukhurov (substituted on) 62'
DF	15	Zafardzhon Zuvaydov
GK	16	Mirali Murodov
DF	24	Suhrob Mansurov
DF	27	Isomiddin Qurvonov
FW	29	Dzhakhongir Dzhalilov (substituted on) 75'
DF	31	Eradzh Kholov
GK	40	Amonsho Sodatsayrov
Head Coach:
Pulad Qadirov

Assistant referees:

- Tamam Hamdoun (Syria)
- Mohammad Jaber A. H. Dharman (Qatar)

Fourth official:

- Tayeb Shamsuzzaman (Bangladesh)

Match rules

- 90 minutes.
- 30 minutes of extra-time if necessary.
- Penalty shoot-out if scores still level.
- Maximum of three substitutions.

== See also ==
- 2008 AFC Challenge Cup
