= Kawa Hesso =

Syrian footballer (born 1984)

Kawa Hesso كَاوَّا حَسُّو
Personal information
- Date of birth: 22 August 1984 (age 42)
- Place of birth: Amuda, Syria
- Height: 1.85 m (6 ft 1 in)
- Position: Goalkeeper

Team information
- Current team: Peshmarga Erbil

Youth career
- Amuda SC

Senior career*
Years	Team	Apps	(Gls)
–2007	Al-Jaish		
2007–2008	Al-Taliya		
2008–2011	Al-Jaish		
2011–2014	Zakho FC		
2015–2016	Peshmarga Erbil		

International career^{‡}
2009–2011	Syria	6	(0)
- * Club domestic league appearances and goals ‡ National team caps and goals as of 13 May 2017

Kawa Hesso (Arabic: كَاوَّا حَسُّو; born August 22, 1984 in Syria) is a Syrian footballer of Kurdish ethnicity. He currently plays for Peshmarga Erbil in Iraq.

== International career ==
He made his debut for the Syria national team in the 2009 Nehru Cup in India. Senior national coach Fajr Ibrahim called him for the first time, and he debuted in Syria's 4–0 win over Sri Lanka on 24 August 2009. He came on as a substitute for Mosab Balhous in the second halftime.

=== Appearances for Syrian national team ===
Results list Syria's goal tally first.

#	Category	Date	Venue	Opponent	Appearances		Goals	Result	#	Competition
#	Category	Date	Venue	Opponent	Start	Sub	Goals	Result	#	Competition
1.	Senior	24 Aug 2009	Ambedkar Stadium, New Delhi, India	Sri Lanka	0	1	0	4-0	W	Nehru Cup 2009
2.	Senior	29 Aug 2009	Ambedkar Stadium, New Delhi, India	India	1	0	0	1-0	W	Nehru Cup 2009

W = Matches won; D = Matches drawn; L = Matches lost

== Honour and Titles ==
=== Club ===
Al-Jaish

- Syrian Premier League: 2009–10
- AFC Cup: 2004

=== National team ===
- Nehru Cup: 2009 Runner-up
