= Mohamed Izzadeen =

Sri Lankan footballer

- Izzadeen against Lebanon Centre-back Ali Al Saadi during the 3rd match of the 2009 Nehru Cup

Personal information
- Full name: Mohamed Naufer Mohamed Izzadeen
- Date of birth: 17 January 1981 (age 45)
- Place of birth: Colombo, Sri Lanka
- Position: Striker

Team information
- Current team: Army

Senior career*
Years	Team	Apps	(Gls)
2005–2006	Ratnam		
2006–2007	Army		
2007–2008	Ratnam	1	(1)
2008–2017	Army		(26)
2017–2019	Defenders		

International career^{‡}
2004–2015	Sri Lanka	34	(9)
- * Club domestic league appearances and goals ‡ National team caps and goals as of 6 September 2013

Mohamed Izzadeen Mohamed Naufer (born 17 January 1981) is a Sri Lankan footballer, who plays either on the left wing or as a striker for Army and the Sri Lanka national football team.

== International career ==
On 6 September 2013, Izzadeen scored 4 goals against Bhutan in the 2013 SAFF Championship. He has also played for Sri Lanka in the 2006 AFC Challenge Cup and 2010 AFC Challenge Cups.

He has scored 9 goals in his career for Sri Lanka at international level.

== Career statistics ==
=== International ===
Appearances and goals by national team and year
National team	Year	Apps	Goals
Sri Lanka	2004	3	0
Sri Lanka	2006	5	2
Sri Lanka	2007	2	0
Sri Lanka	2008	2	0
Sri Lanka	2009	9	3
Sri Lanka	2010	3	0
Sri Lanka	2011	6	0
Sri Lanka	2013	3	4
Sri Lanka	2015	1	0
Total		34	9

Scores and results list Sri Lanka's goal tally first, score column indicates score after each Izzadeen goal.

List of international goals scored by Mohamed Izzadeen
No.	Date	Venue	Opponent	Score	Result	Competition	Ref.
1	8 April 2006	M. A. Aziz Stadium, Chittagong, Bangladesh	Nepal	1-0	1-1	Friendly	
2	8 April 2006	M. A. Aziz Stadium, Chittagong, Bangladesh	Taiwan	1-0	3-0	Friendly	
3	22 August 2009	Dr. Ambedkar Stadium, New Delhi, India	Lebanon	1-0	4-3	Friendly	
4	22 August 2009	Dr. Ambedkar Stadium, New Delhi, India	Lebanon	2-2	4-3	Friendly	
5	22 August 2009	Dr. Ambedkar Stadium, New Delhi, India	Lebanon	4-2	4-3	Friendly	
6	6 September 2013	Halchowk Stadium, Kathmandu, Nepal	Bhutan	1-0	5-2	2013 SAFF Championship	
7	6 September 2013	Halchowk Stadium, Kathmandu, Nepal	Bhutan	2-0	5-2	2013 SAFF Championship	
8	6 September 2013	Halchowk Stadium, Kathmandu, Nepal	Bhutan	4-1	5-2	2013 SAFF Championship	
9	6 September 2013	Halchowk Stadium, Kathmandu, Nepal	Bhutan	5-2	5-2	2013 SAFF Championship	

== Honours ==
=== Individual ===
- Nehru Cup Top Scorer: 2009
