= Jwan Hesso =

Syrian footballer (born 1982)

Jwan Hesso جوان حسو
Personal information
- Date of birth: 10 October 1982 (age 44)
- Place of birth: Aleppo, Syria
- Position: Defender

Team information
- Current team: That Ras

Senior career*
Years	Team	Apps	(Gls)
?–2007	Al-Jihad Qameshli	?	(?)
2007–2008	Al-Shorta	?	(?)
2008–2011	Al-Jaish	?	(?)
2012	That Ras		

International career^{‡}
2009	Syria	5	(0)
- * Club domestic league appearances and goals ‡ National team caps and goals as of 29 August 2009

Jwan Hesso (Arabic: جوان حسو; born October 10, 1982, in Aleppo) is a Syrian footballer who played for That Ras in the Jordan League. Hesso was born in Aleppo to an ethnic Kurdish family.

== International career ==
Hesso was a regular for the Syria national football team since 2009.

=== Appearances for Syrian national team ===
Results list Syria's goal tally first.

#	Category	Date	Venue	Opponent	Appearances		Goals	Result	#	Competition
#	Category	Date	Venue	Opponent	Start	Sub	Goals	Result	#	Competition
1.	Senior	05 Jun 2009	Abbasiyyin Stadium, Damascus, Syria	Sierra Leone	0	1	0	6-0	W	International Friendly^{1}
2.	Senior	20 Aug 2009	Ambedkar Stadium, New Delhi, India	Kyrgyzstan	0	1	0	2-0	W	Nehru Cup 2009
3.	Senior	24 Aug 2009	Ambedkar Stadium, New Delhi, India	Sri Lanka	0	1	0	4-0	W	Nehru Cup 2009
4.	Senior	27 Aug 2009	Ambedkar Stadium, New Delhi, India	Lebanon	0	1	0	1-0	W	Nehru Cup 2009
5.	Senior	29 Aug 2009	Ambedkar Stadium, New Delhi, India	India	1	0	0	1-0	W	Nehru Cup 2009

W = Matches won; D = Matches drawn; L = Matches lost

^{1} Non FIFA 'A' international match

== Honour and Titles ==
=== Club ===
Al-Jaish

- Syrian Premier League: 2009–10

=== National team ===
- Nehru Cup: 2009 Runner-up
