= Moustafa Shakosh =

Syrian footballer (born 1986)

Moustafa Shakosh مصطفى شاكوش
Personal information
- Date of birth: November 13, 1986 (age 39)
- Place of birth: Amuda, Syria
- Height: 1.84 m (6 ft 1/2 in)
- Position: Goalkeeper

Team information
- Current team: Teshrin SC
- Number: 47

Senior career*
Years	Team	Apps	(Gls)
2004–2012	Teshrin SC	?	(?)

International career^{‡}
2003–2005	Syria U-20		
2009	Syria	1	(0)
- * Club domestic league appearances and goals as of 8 June 2009 ‡ National team caps and goals as of 8 June 2009

Moustafa Shakosh (Arabic: مصطفى شاكوش) (born November 13, 1986, in Amuda) is a Syrian footballer. He currently plays for Teshrin SC.

== International career ==
Shakosh plays between 2003-2005 for the Under-19 Syrian national team. The Syrian U-19 team that finished in Fourth place in the AFC U-19 Championship 2004 in Malaysia and he was a part of the Syrian U-20 team in the FIFA U-20 World Cup 2005. in the Netherlands. He plays against Colombia in the group-stage of the FIFA U-20 World Cup 2005.

He has been a regular for the Syria national football team since 2009. Senior national coach Fajr Ibrahim called him for the first time, and he debuted in a 5 June 2009 friendly against Sierra Leone. He came on as a substitute for Mosab Balhous.

=== Appearances for Syrian national team ===
Results list Syria's goal tally first.

#	Category	Date	Venue	Opponent	Appearances		Goals	Result	#	Competition
#	Category	Date	Venue	Opponent	Start	Sub	Goals	Result	#	Competition
1.	Senior	05 Jun 2009	Abbasiyyin Stadium, Damascus, Syria	Sierra Leone	0	1	0	6-0	W	International Friendly^{1}

W = Matches won; D = Matches drawn; L = Matches lost

^{1} Non FIFA 'A' international match

== Honour and Titles ==
=== National team ===
- Nehru Cup: 2009 Runner-up
