= Mutaz Kailouni =

Syrian footballer (born 1985)

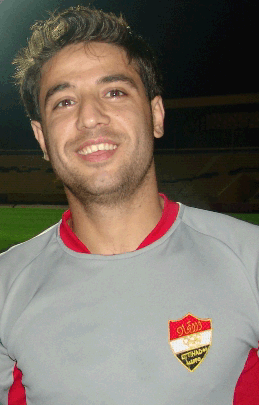

Personal information
- Date of birth: 10 March 1985 (age 41)
- Place of birth: Latakia, Syria
- Height: 1.80 m (5 ft 11 in)
- Position: Midfielder

Team information
- Current team: Al-Busaiteen

Senior career*
| Years | Team | Apps | (Gls) |
| 2001–2008 | Tishreen | | |
| 2008–2009 | Al-Jazeera | | |
| 2009 | Tishreen | | |
| 2009–2010 | Al-Ittihad | 24 | (0) |
| 2010–2011 | Al-Jaish | | |
| 2011–2012 | Steel Azin | | |
| 2012–2013 | Talaba SC | 12 | (1) |
| 2013 | Al-Naft | 18 | (5) |
| 2014– | Al-Busaiteen | 8 | (1) |

International career
| 2003–2005 | Syria U-20 | | |
| 2007–2008 | Syria U-23 | | |
| 2004–2010 | Syria | 14 | (1) |
- * Club domestic league appearances and goals as of 5 September 2013

Mutaz Kailouni (Arabic: معتز كيلوني; born 10 March 1985 in Latakia, Syria) is a Syrian footballer. He currently plays for Al-Busaiteen which competes in Bahrain.

== International career ==
Kailouni was a part of the Syrian U-19 national team that finished in Fourth place at the 2004 AFC U-19 Championship in Malaysia and he was a part of the Syrian U-20 national team at the 2005 FIFA U-20 World Cup in the Netherlands. He plays against Canada, Italy and Colombia in the group-stage of the FIFA U-20 World Cup and against Brazil in the Round of 16.

=== International goals ===
Scores and results table. Syria's goal tally first:

Meaataz Kailouni: International goals
| Goal | Date | Venue | Opponent | Score | Result | Competition |
|---|---|---|---|---|---|---|
| 1 | 31 March 2004 | Spartak Stadium, Bishkek, Kyrgyzstan | Kyrgyzstan | 1-1 | 1-1 | 2006 FIFA World Cup qualification |

== Honours ==
=== National team ===
- AFC U-19 Championship 2004: Fourth place
- FIFA U-20 World Cup 2005: Round of 16
- Nehru Cup: 2009 Runner-up
