= Rustem Usanov =

Kyrgyzstani footballer

Rustem Usmanov
Personal information
- Full name: Rustem Usmanov
- Date of birth: 12 September 1985 (age 41)
- Place of birth: Soviet Union
- Position: Defender

Senior career*
Years	Team	Apps	(Gls)
2007–	FC Abdish-Ata Kant		

International career^{‡}
2009–	Kyrgyzstan	11	(2)
- * Club domestic league appearances and goals ‡ National team caps and goals as of 19 November 2012

Rustem Usmanov (born 12 September 1985) is a Kyrgyzstan footballer, who plays for FC Abdish-Ata Kant as a defender.

== International career ==
He is a member of the Kyrgyzstan national football team from 2009.

== Career statistics ==
=== International ===
Kyrgyzstan national team
Year	Apps	Goals
2009	6	1
2010	2	0
2011	2	1
2012	0	0
2013	0	0
2014	1	0
Total	11	2

Statistics accurate as of match played 5 September 2014

=== International Goals ===
#	Date	Venue	Opponent	Score	Result	Competition	Ref
1.	28 August 2009	Ambedkar Stadium, New Delhi, India	Sri Lanka	4–1	4–1	2009 Nehru Cup	
2.	25 March 2011	Rasmee Dhandu Stadium, Malé, Maldives	Cambodia	1–0	4–3	2012 AFC Challenge Cup qualification	
