= Bakri Tarab =

Syrian footballer

Bakri Tarab بكري طراب
Personal information
- Date of birth: 20 January 1985 (age 41)
- Place of birth: Aleppo, Syria
- Height: 1.75 m (5 ft 9 in)
- Positions: Midfielder; defender

Team information
- Current team: Najaf FC
- Number: 8

Youth career
- Al-Ittihad

Senior career*
Years	Team	Apps	(Gls)
2003– 2009	Al-Ittihad		
2009– 2010	Taliya SC		
2010– 2012	Al-Shorta		
2012– 2013	Sulaymaniyah FC	13	(0)
2013	Najaf FC	9	(0)
2013–2014	Al-Karkh	1	(0)
2014	Najaf FC		

International career
2006–2010	Syria	33	(0)
- * Club domestic league appearances and goals

Bakri Tarab (Arabic: بكري طراب) (born 20 January 1985 in Aleppo, Syria) is a Syrian football player who is currently playing for Al Masafi in the Iraqi Premier League.

== Honour and Titles ==
=== National team ===
- Nehru Cup:
  - Runner-up (1): 2009
