= Deepak Mondal =

Indian footballer (born 1979)

Deepak Kumar Mandal
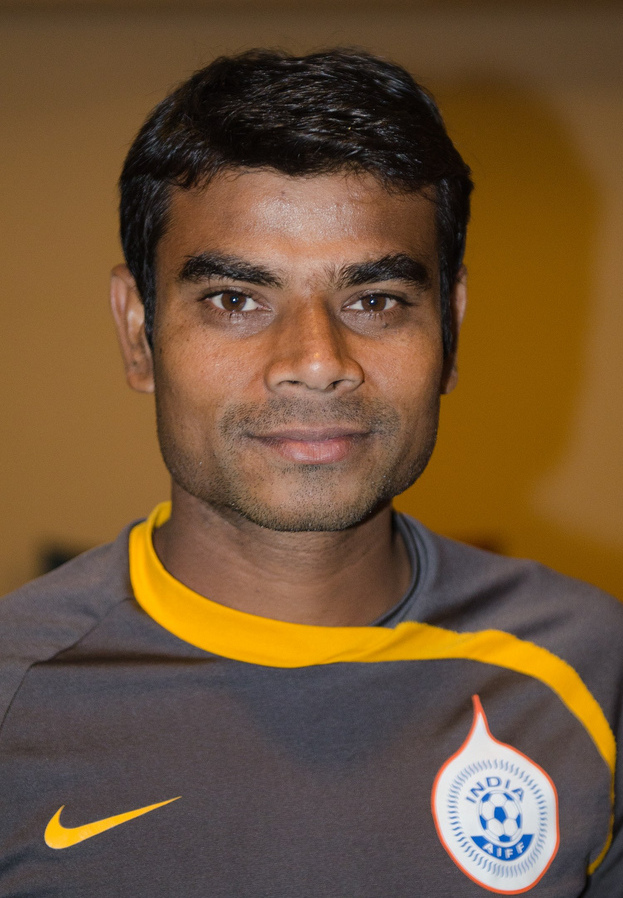
- Mondal in 2011

Personal information
- Full name: Deepak Kumar Mandal
- Date of birth: 12 October 1979 (age 47)
- Place of birth: Noamundi, Jharkhand, India
- Height: 1.73 m (5 ft 8 in)
- Position: Centre-back

Youth career
- 1995–1998: Tata FA

Senior career*
| Years | Team | Apps | (Gls) |
| 1998–2000 | JCT Mills Phagwara | | |
| 2000–2005 | East Bengal | | |
| 2005–2006 | Mahindra United | | |
| 2006–2011 | Mohun Bagan | | |
| 2011–2014 | United | | |
| 2014 | Mumbai City | 12 | (0) |
| 2014–2016 | East Bengal | 25 | (0) |
| 2015 | → Kerala Blasters (loan) | 2 | (0) |
| 2016 | Southern Samity | | |
| 2016–17 | Ozone | | |
| 2018 | FCI | 1 | (0) |

International career
| 2002 | India U23 | | |
| 1999–2011 | India | 47 | (0) |
- * Club domestic league appearances and goals

Deepak Kumar Mondal (born 12 October 1979) is an Indian former professional footballer who played as a centre-back. A graduate of the Tata Football Academy, An Arjuna Award winner, he was one of India's most prominent right backs for over a decade, earning 47 caps with the India national team. Mondal also played with both the Kolkata giants, East Bengal and Mohun Bagan, spending five years at each club, captaining both of them.

== Club career ==
Born in Noamundi, Jharkhand, Mondal began playing football from a young age in his district. He was spotted by Tata Football Academy coach, Ranjan Chowdhury, at the age of sixteen who invited Mondal to join the academy. Mondol graduated from the Tata Football Academy in 1998. After graduating from the academy, Mondal signed with National Football League side, JCT Mills Phagwara. He stayed at the club for two seasons before joining Kolkata side, East Bengal. It was at East Bengal that Mondal began to impress and even earn himself caps for India. On 30 December 2002, after impressing the All India Football Federation and national team head coach, Stephen Constantine, with his performances in the Asian Games and the ASEAN Club Championship for East Bengal, Mondal was named the AIFF Player of the Year. On winning the award, AIFF president at the time, Priya Ranjan Dasmunsi, said that Mondal "infused a new confidence in the deep defense". Overall, while with East Bengal, Mondal won the National Football League title three times, two Durand Cup's, and four Calcutta Football League titles. While at East Bengal, Mondal was part of a strong backline with Surkumar Singh and Mahesh Gawli.

Mondal stayed with East Bengal until 2005, when he signed for Mumbai side Mahindra United. While with Mahindra United Mondal won another NFL title. He also won a Federation Cup while with the side. After a season with Mahindra United, Mondal moved back to Kolkata to sign with East Bengal rivals, Mohun Bagan. On 22 December 2008, Mondal helped Mohun Bagan win their only national title while with the club, the Federation Cup. The club defeated Dempo to win their thirteenth Federation Cup title and Mondal's second. In September 2010, Mondal was awarded the Arjuna Award.

After representing India at the 2011 AFC Asian Cup, Mondal saw out his contract with Mohun Bagan and was released by the club. On 17 August 2011 it was announced that Mondal had signed with newly rebranded Kolkata side, Prayag United, with them being based in Kolkata a main reason for him signing. Despite the club going through financial troubles, Mondal remained with the side, soon renamed to just United, till 2014. On 9 May 2014 it was announced Mondal had re-signed with East Bengal. While with East Bengal, Mondal also represented Mumbai City and Kerala Blasters in the Indian Super League.

After two years with East Bengal again, Mondal signed for Calcutta Football League side Southern Samity. After the season concluded, Mondal signed with Ozone FC for the DSK Cup.

== International career ==
Mondal represented India 47 times. He won two Nehru Cup's with India, first in 2007 and then 2009. He also helped India win the 2008 AFC Challenge Cup and thus qualify for the 2011 AFC Asian Cup, their first in 27 years. Like at club level, Mondal thrived under his partnership with Mahesh Gawli with India.

== Honours ==
East Bengal

- IFA Shield: 2000
- ASEAN Club Championship: 2003

India

- AFC Challenge Cup: 2008
- SAFF Championship: 1999; runner-up: 2008
- Nehru Cup: 2007, 2009
- South Asian Games Bronze medal: 1999

India U23

- LG Cup: 2002

Individual

- AIFF Player of the Year: 2002
- He twice won the Nehru Cup: in 2007 and 2009, held in New Delhi, India where Syria, India, Kyrgyzstan, Cambodia, and Bangladesh were the participating countries.
- Mondal was instrumental in leading team India to win the AFC (Asian Football Confederation) Challenge Cup, held in the year 2008 hosted by India. This success enabled team India to qualify for the 2011 AFC Asian Cup.
- Mondal was honored with the Arjuna Award in the year 2010.
