= Ali Diab =

Syrian footballer (born 1982)

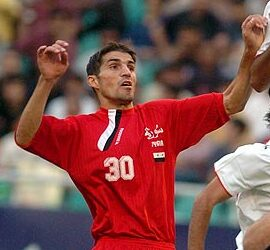
- Diab in 2006

Personal information
- Date of birth: 23 May 1982 (age 44)
- Place of birth: Hafeir al-Fouqa, Rif Dimashq, Syria
- Height: 1.86 m (6 ft 1 in)
- Position: Centre back

Senior career*
Years	Team	Apps	(Gls)
2003–2010	Al-Majd		
2004–2005	→ Al-Jaish (loan)		
2010	→ Shanghai Shenhua (loan)	27	(0)
2010–2011	Al-Shorta		
2011–2013	Duhok	59	(3)
2013–2019	Al-Wahda	25	(5)

International career
2004–2013	Syria	97	(4)
- * Club domestic league appearances and goals

Ali Diab (Arabic: عَلِيّ دِيَاب; born 23 May 1982) is a Syrian former professional association footballer who played as a centre back. With 97 appearances he is the second most-capped player on the Syria national team.

== International career ==
Diab was a regular for the Syria national team from 2004. He made 10 appearances for Syria during the qualifying rounds of the 2010 FIFA World Cup.

In the 2009 Nehru Cup, Diab scored one goal in Syria's 1–0 victory over India.

Diab was selected to Valeriu Tiţa's 23-man final squad for the 2011 AFC Asian Cup in Qatar. He played in all of Syria's three group games against Saudi Arabia, Japan and Jordan. In the match against Jordan, Diab scored an own goal.

Diab is Syria's second most-capped player with 97 caps.

== Career statistics ==
Scores and results table. Syria's goal tally first:

Ali Diab: International goals
No.	Date	Venue	Opponent	Score	Result	Competition
1	18 January 2009	Al-Sadaqua Walsalam Stadium, Kuwait City, Kuwait	Turkmenistan	1–1	5–1	International Friendly
2	29 August 2009	Ambedkar Stadium, New Delhi, India	India	1–0	1–0	2009 Nehru Cup
3	31 August 2009	Ambedkar Stadium, New Delhi, India	India	1–1	1–1	2009 Nehru Cup

== Honour ==
Syria

- Nehru Cup: runner-up 2007, 2009.
