= Abdul Fattah Al Agha =

Syrian footballer (born 1984)

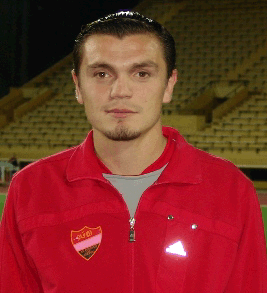

Personal information
- Full name: Abdul Fattah Al Agha Noaman
- Date of birth: 1 August 1984 (age 42)
- Place of birth: Aleppo, Syria
- Height: 1.80 m (5 ft 11 in)
- Position: Striker

Youth career
- Al Ittihad Aleppo

Senior career*
Years	Team	Apps	(Gls)
2002–2010	Al Ittihad Aleppo	149	(45)
2010–2015	Wadi Degla	79	(20)
2015	→ El Gouna (loan)	12	(1)
2015–2016	Baghdad	?	(?)
2016–2017	FC Masr	?	(?)
2017–2018	El Qanah	?	(?)
Total		240+	(66+)

International career
2003–2004	Syria U-20		
2004–2016	Syria	21	(6)
- * Club domestic league appearances and goals

Abdul Fattah Al Agha Noaman (Arabic: عَبْد الْفَتَّاح الْآغَا نُعْمَان; born 1 August 1984), is a retired Syrian footballer who played as a striker. He spent the majority of his career playing for Syrian side Al Ittihad Aleppo and other clubs from Egypt.

== Career ==
=== Club career ===
On 20 June 2010, Al Agha moved to Wadi Degla in the Egyptian Premier League and signed a 3-year contract.

=== International career ===
Al Agha was a part of the Syrian Under-19 national team that finished in Fourth place in the 2004 AFC U-19 Championship in Malaysia. He scored one goal in Syria's 4–1 win over Laos in the second match of the group-stage.

Al Agha has been a regular for the Syria national football team since 2004. He was a part of the Syria national football team in the 2010 FIFA World Cup qualification.

In the 2009 Nehru Cup in India, Al Agha scored one goal in a 2–0 victory over Kyrgyzstan in Syria's opening match of the tournament. He scored the second goal for Syria after Mohamed Al Zeno opened the scoring. He also scored two goals in Syria's 4–0 win over Sri Lanka and finished as top scorer of the friendly tournament.

Al Agha was selected to Valeriu Tiţa's 23-man final squad for the 2011 AFC Asian Cup in Qatar. He came as a substitute in the second group game against Japan, replacing Jehad Al Hussain in the 77th minute.

==== International goals ====
As of match played 5 June 2016. Syria score listed first, score column indicates score after each Al Agha goal.

International goals by date, venue, cap, opponent, score, result and competition
No.	Date	Venue	Opponent	Score	Result	Competition
1	20 August 2009	Ambedkar Stadium, New Delhi, India	Kyrgyzstan	2–0	2–0	Friendly
2	24 August 2009	Ambedkar Stadium, New Delhi, India	Sri Lanka	3–0	4–0	Friendly
3	24 August 2009	Ambedkar Stadium, New Delhi, India	Sri Lanka	4–0	4–0	Friendly
4	3 March 2010	Abbasiyyin Stadium, Damascus, Syria	Lebanon	2–0	4–0	2011 AFC Asian Cup qualification
5	15 November 2013	Shahid Dastgerdi Stadium, Tehran, Iran	Singapore	4–0	4–0	2015 AFC Asian Cup qualification
6	3 June 2016	Rajamangala Stadium, Bangkok, Thailand	Thailand	2–2	2–2 (6–7 p)	2016 King's Cup

== Honour and titles ==
=== Club ===
Al Ittihad Aleppo

- Syrian Premier League: 2005
- Syrian Cup: 2005, 2006

=== National team ===
- AFC U-19 Championship 2004: Fourth place
- Nehru Cup: 2009 Runner-up

=== Individual ===
- Top Goalscorer Nehru Cup: 2009 (3 goals)
