= Abdelrazaq Al-Hussain =

Syrian footballer (born 1986)

Abdelrazaq Al Hussain
Personal information
- Full name: Abdelrazaq Al-Hussain
- Date of birth: 15 September 1986 (age 40)
- Place of birth: Aleppo, Syria
- Height: 1.85 m (6 ft 1 in)
- Position: Midfielder

Senior career*
Years	Team	Apps	(Gls)
2003–2006	Al-Hurriya	?	(?)
2006–2010	Al-Jaish	?	(?)
2010–2011	Al-Karamah	14	(3)
2011–2012	Al-Taawon	16	(1)
2012	Erbil	18	(4)
2012–2013	Dibba Al-Fujairah	13	(2)
2013–2014	Hatta	41	(34)
2014–2015	Dibba Al-Hisn		
2015	Al-Riyadh		
2015–2016	Al-Ahed		
2016–2017	Al-Nejmeh		
2018	Al-Nasr		
2019	Al-Ansar		

International career^{‡}
2003–2005	Syria U-20	11	(3)
2007–2008	Syria U-23	10	(1)
2006–2016	Syria	56	(12)
- * Club domestic league appearances and goals as of 20 March 2011 ‡ National team caps and goals as of 6 October 2016

Abdelrazaq Al-Hussain (Arabic: عَبْد الرَّزَّاق الْحُسَيْن; born 15 September 1986, in Aleppo) is a Syrian footballer who plays as a midfielder for Saudi Arabian club Al-Ansar and the Syria national team.

== Career ==
=== Club career ===
Al Hussain's career began in the youth system of Al-Hurriya before starting his professional career with the senior team. He moved to Syrian League club Al-Jaish in 2006. In August 2010, he transferred to SPL club Al-Karamah. Al Hussain moved to Saudi Professional League club Al-Taawon in July 2011 but the contract has been dissolved in February 2012. Al Hussain then moved to Iraq and signed a contract with Arbil SC.

=== International career ===
Al Hussain was a part of the Syrian Under-19 national team that finished in Fourth place in the 2004 AFC U-19 Championship in Malaysia and he was a part of the Syrian U-20 national team in the 2005 FIFA U-20 World Cup in the Netherlands. He plays against Canada and Italy in the group-stage of the FIFA U-20 World Cup and against Brazil in the Round of 16. He scored one goal in the second match of the group-stage against Italy.

He has been a regular for the Syrian national football team since 2006. Al Hussain was selected to Valeriu Tiţa's 23-man final squad for the 2011 AFC Asian Cup in Qatar and he started the opening group game against Saudi Arabia and scored Syria's two goals in a 2–1 victory. He played the remaining two group games against Japan and Jordan.

== International statistics ==
Scores and results table. Syria's goal tally first:

Abdelrazaq Al Hussain: International goals
No.	Date	Venue	Opponent	Score	Result	Competition
1	24 August 2009	Ambedkar Stadium, New Delhi, India	Sri Lanka	2–0	4–0	2009 Nehru Cup
2	19 February 2010	Al-Nahyan Stadium, Abu Dhabi, United Arab Emirates	Kuwait	1–0	1–1	International Friendly
3	3 March 2010	Abbasiyyin Stadium, Damascus, Syria	Lebanon	4–0	4–0	2011 AFC Asian Cup qualification
4	8 October 2010	Kunming Tuodong Sports Center, Kunming, China	China	1–2	1–2	International Friendly
5	9 January 2011	Ahmed bin Ali Stadium, Al Rayyan, Qatar	Saudi Arabia	1–0	2–1	2011 AFC Asian Cup
6	9 January 2011	Ahmed bin Ali Stadium, Al Rayyan, Qatar	Saudi Arabia	2–1	2–1	2011 AFC Asian Cup
7	29 June 2011	Franso Hariri Stadium, Arbil, Iraq	Iraq	1–0	2–1	International Friendly
8	5 July 2011	Atatürk Olympic Stadium, Istanbul, Turkey	Jordan	2–1	3–1	International Friendly
9	31 March 2015	Pamir Stadium, Dushanbe, Tajikistan	Tajikistan	3–1	3–2	International Friendly
10	24 May 2015	Saida International Stadium, Sidon, Lebanon	Lebanon	1–0	2–2	International Friendly
11	11 June 2015	Samen Stadium, Mashhad, Iran	Afghanistan	4–0	6–0	2018 FIFA World Cup qualification
12	24 March 2016	Al-Seeb Stadium, Seeb, Oman	Cambodia	5–0	6–0	2018 FIFA World Cup qualification

== Honour and titles ==
=== Club ===
Al-Jaish Damascus

- Syrian Premier League: 2009–10

=== National team ===
- AFC U-19 Championship 2004: Fourth place
- FIFA U-20 World Cup 2005: Round of 16
- Nehru Cup: 2009 Runners-up
