= Steven Dias =

Indian footballer (born 1983)

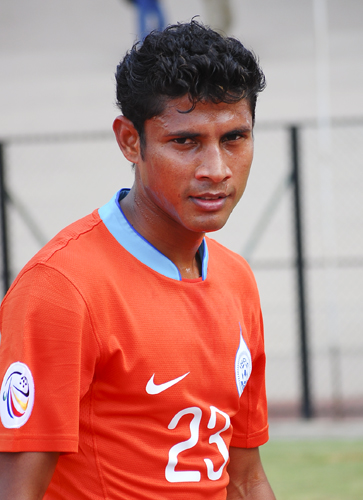

Personal information
- Full name: Steven Benedic Dias
- Date of birth: 25 December 1983 (age 42)
- Place of birth: Mumbai, India
- Height: 1.73 m (5 ft 8 in)
- Position: Right midfielder

Team information
- Current team: Jamshedpur B (head coach)

Senior career*
Years	Team	Apps	(Gls)
2001–2003	Air India	34	(6)
2003–2011	Mahindra United	258	(46)
2011–2012	Churchill Brothers	26	(4)
2012-2013	Mumbai Tigers	38	(4)
2013-2014	Rangdajied United	38	(4)
2014-2015	Delhi Dynamos FC	32	(2)
2015-2016	Bharat FC	34	(4)
2016–2017	Mumbai FC	34	(2)

International career
2004-2006	India U23	12	(4)
2004–2011	India	75	(10)

Managerial career
- 2019–: Jamshedpur FC (assistant coach)
- 2021–2022: Odisha FC (interim coach)
- 2022–2023: Ambernath United Atlanta
- 2022–2023: Maharashtra
- 2023–2026: Jamshedpur B
- 2026–: Chanmari
- * Club domestic league appearances and goals

Steven Benedic Dias (born 25 December 1983) is an Indian former professional footballer who is currently the head coach of Chanmari playing in the Indian Football League. Dias made his debut for India in 2006. In his playing days, he was known as the "David Beckham of India".

== Club career ==
Dias played for one of India's leading clubs Mahindra United (before the club withdrew from Indian football on 30 April 2010 and was disbanded) and played in their NFL winning team, as well as in the AFC Cup.

He later played for clubs in the I-League such as Churchill Brothers where he made 25 appearances and scored 4 goals. He also played for Mumbai Tigers, Rangdajied United, Delhi Dynamos FC in the inaugural season of the ISL and Bharat FC where he made 17 appearances. He signed for Mumbai FC in 2016 after Bharat FC withdrew from the I-league.

Dias has started a club named Ambitious Football Academy in Don Bosco vidyyavihar. He hopes to bring a sensation of football in the youth of the Mumbai.

== International career ==
Dias made his debut for India in 2004, and was a part of the team that unsuccessfully attempted to qualify for the AFC Asian Cup 2007. He played in India's first Nehru cup title in 2007, scoring twice in a 6–0 win over Cambodia. He usually takes corners for India and scored straight from one of in a 2–2 draw against Lebanon. He was a regular for the India national team and played an integral role in India's win in the 2008 AFC Challenge Cup. He was a key player in India's win over Syria in the Nehru Cup of 2009. He helped India qualify for the 2011 Asian Cup in Qatar. He had been chosen to be part of the 30 man squad preparing for the 2011 Asian Cup in Doha. His combination and understanding with striker, Sunil Chhetri, made them a very threatening duo.

In 2012 AFC Challenge Cup qualification match against Pakistan he scored a goal. During the Indian Caribbean tour on 24 August 2011 Dias scored a goal against Guyana but could not stop India from losing the match 1–2.

=== International goals ===
Goal	Date	Venue	Opponent	Score	Result	Competition
1	17 August 2007	Ambedkar Stadium, Delhi, India	Cambodia	4–0	6–0	2007 Nehru Cup
2	17 August 2007	Ambedkar Stadium, Delhi, India	Cambodia	5–0	6–0	2007 Nehru Cup
3	30 October 2007	Fatorda Stadium, Margao, India	Lebanon	2–2	2–2	2010 World Cup qualification
4	5 June 2008	Rasmee Dhandu Stadium, Malé	Pakistan	2–0	2–1	2008 SAFF Cup
5	26 August 2009	Ambedkar Stadium, New Delhi, India	Sri Lanka	3–1	3–1	2009 Nehru Cup
6	23 March 2011	Petaling Jaya Stadium, Petaling Jaya, Malaysia	Pakistan	3–1	3–1	2012 AFC Challenge Cup qualification
7	24 August 2011	Al Sadd Stadium, Guyana	Guyana	1–1	1–2	Friendly

== Honours ==
=== Player ===
India

- AFC Challenge Cup: 2008
- SAFF Championship: 2005, 2011; runner-up: 2008
- Nehru Cup: 2007, 2009

=== Manager ===
Ambernath United Atlanta

- MDFA Elite League: 2022, 2023

== Political career ==
Dias joined the Shiv Sena on 3 February 2022 in the presence of Maharashtra Tourism Minister and Shiv Sena leader Aaditya Thackeray in Mumbai.
