= Ambedkar Stadium =

Football stadium in New Delhi, India

Dr. Ambedkar Stadium
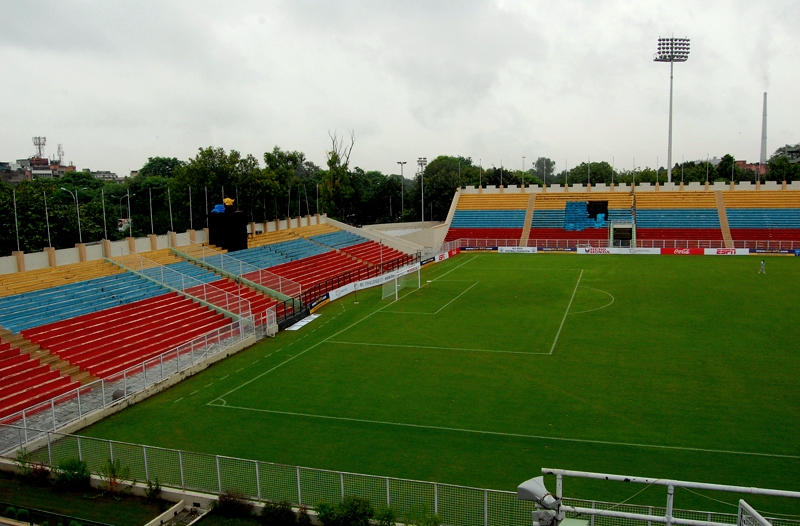
- Interactive map of Dr. Ambedkar Stadium
- Former names: Delhi Gate Stadium
- Location: Feroz Shah Kotla, New Delhi
- Coordinates: 28.639°N 77.242°E
- Owner: Municipal Corporation of Delhi (MCD)
- Capacity: 35,000
- Surface: Grass
- Field size: 101m x 67.5m
- Public transit: Delhi Gate

Construction
- Renovated: 2007, 2010, 2025

Tenants
- Sudeva Delhi; Delhi FC; HOPS FC; Delhi Football League; FD Women's League; Football Delhi competitions

Dr. Ambedkar Stadium is a football stadium in New Delhi, though part of Central Delhi, Delhi, India. The stadium is named after B. R. Ambedkar, social reformer and architect of the Constitution of India. It was earlier known as Corporation Stadium. It has held competitions like the Delhi Football League, the DCM Trophy, the Subroto Cup and the Durand Cup. It houses offices of the Delhi Soccer Association. It was renovated and reopened in 2007 and has a listed capacity of 35,000. The stadium has hosted international football finals such as the 2007 and 2009 Nehru Cup.

In October 2022, the Indian Football League side Rajasthan United FC announced that they will use Ambedkar Stadium as home ground due to unavailability of prominent stadium in their state.

== History ==
=== Renovation ===
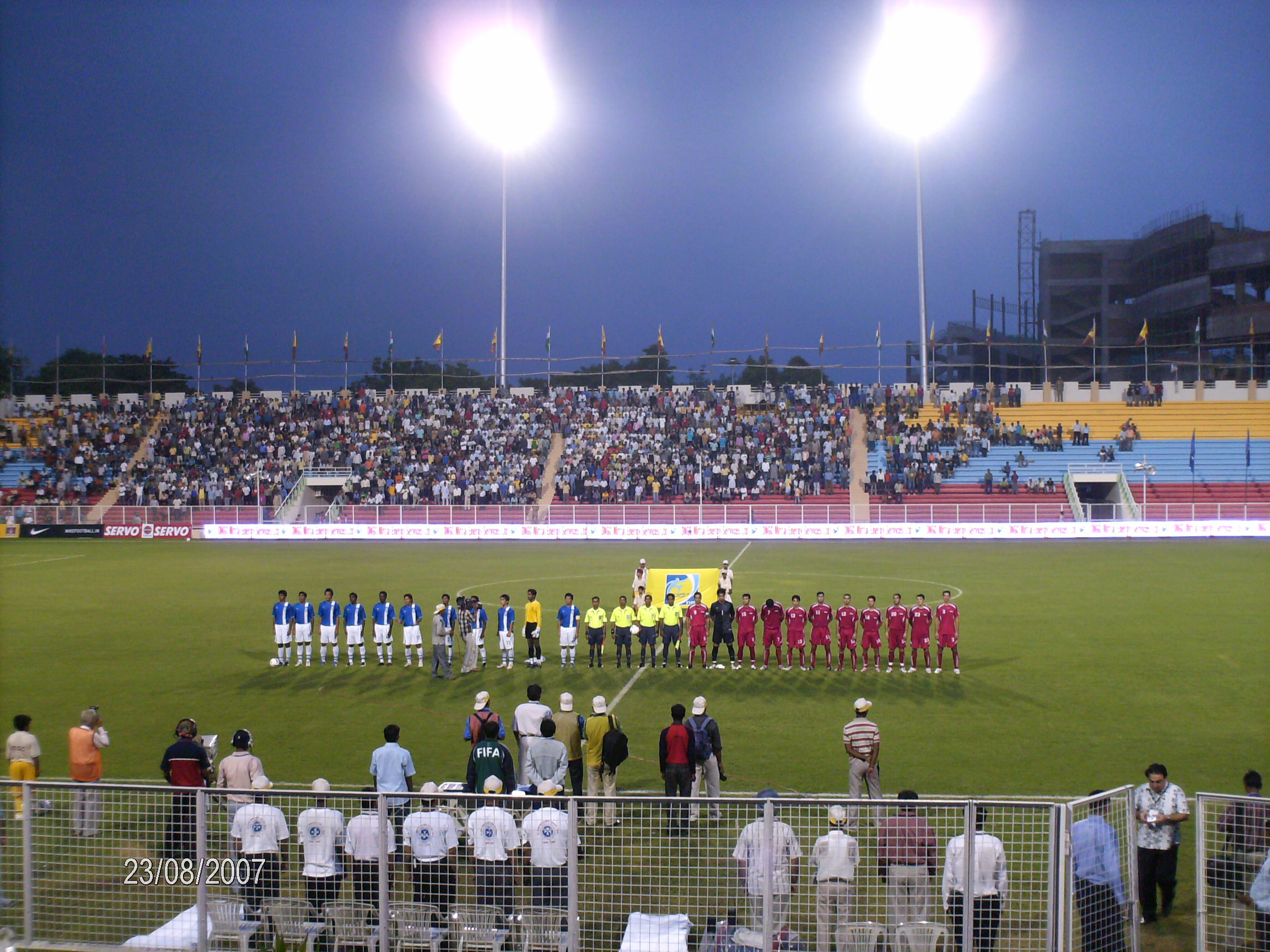
India vs Syria on the 2007 Nehru Cup

In 2007, the stadium was renovated and floodlights were installed. In August 2007 the stadium hosted its first tournament under floodlights, the 2007 Nehru Cup.

=== Controversy ===
At the start of the 2010–11 I-League season Indian Arrows were expected to play its I-League matches at the stadium, but due to the stadium owners, the Municipal Corporation of Delhi (MCD), holding non-sporting events on the pitch the pitch forced Arrows to play their matches at the Tau Devi Lal Stadium in Gurgaon.

=== Renovation to meet International standards ===
In 2024, plans were issued by the Delhi Soccer Association to revamp the stadium at an estimated cost of ₹5 crore. The revamped stadium will be equipped with dressing rooms, toilets, cafeterias and media centres.

== Major matches ==
29 August 2007 2007 Nehru Cup Final	India	1–0	Syria	New Delhi
	Pradeep 44'			Stadium: Ambedkar Stadium; Referee: Sikhrakar Surendra (India)

13 August 2008 2008 AFC Challenge Cup	Myanmar	0–4	North Korea	New Delhi
16:00		AFC	Pak Song-Chol 10', 12', 44' (pen.); Ro Hak-Su 53'	Stadium: Ambedkar Stadium; Attendance: 1,000; Referee: Khalid Al-Senan (UAE)

13 August 2008 2008 AFC Challenge Cup	India	4–1	Tajikistan	New Delhi
19:00	Chhetri 9', 23', 75'; Bhutia 18'	AFC	Fatkhuloev 44'	Stadium: Ambedkar Stadium; Attendance: 10,000; Referee: Valentin Kovalenko (Uzbekistan)

31 August 2009 2009 Nehru Cup Final	India	1–1 (a.e.t.) (5–4 p)	Syria	New Delhi
	Renedy 114'		Diab 120+3'	Stadium: Ambedkar Stadium; Attendance: 20,000; Referee: Ali Adil (Maldives)
	Penalties
	(penalty scored) Lawrence; (penalty missed) Renedy; (penalty scored) Chhetri; (penalty scored) Dias; (penalty missed) Wadoo; (penalty scored) A. Ali; (penalty scored) Surkumar		Rafe (penalty scored); Ayan (penalty missed); Haj Mohamad (penalty missed); Balhous (penalty scored); Al Agha (penalty scored); Al Hussain (penalty scored); Al Aitoni (penalty missed)

28 July 2011 2014 FIFA WC AFC Qualifier Round2	India	2–2	United Arab Emirates	New Delhi
	Lalpekhula 73'; Singh 90+2'	FIFA	Al Shehhi 39'; Al-Wehaibi 71'	Stadium: Ambedkar Stadium; Attendance: 13,000; Referee: Abdul Malik Bashir (Singapore)

== See also ==
- List of football stadiums in India
