= Rustam Zakirov =

Kyrgyzstani footballer (1989–2020)

Personal information
- Full name: Rustam Zakirov
- Date of birth: 19 December 1989
- Place of birth: Kyrgyzstan
- Date of death: 15 April 2020 (aged 30)
- Position: Midfielder

Team information
- Current team: Alga Bishkek
- Number: 3

Senior career*
Years	Team	Apps	(Gls)
2004–2005	Kyrgyzstan U-21		
2006	Muras-Sport Bishkek		
2007–2012	Abdish-Ata Kant		
2012–2015	Alga Bishkek		

International career^{‡}
2007–2010	Kyrgyzstan	7	(0)
- * Club domestic league appearances and goals as of 13 August 2015 ‡ National team caps and goals as of 13 August 2015

Rustam Zakirov (Russian: Рустам Закиров; 19 December 1989 – 15 April 2020) was a Kyrgyzstani footballer who was a midfielder. He was well known for playing for Abdish-Ata Kant and Alga Bishkek. He was a member of the Kyrgyzstan national football team.

== Career statistics ==
=== International ===
Kyrgyzstan national team
Year	Apps	Goals
2007	5	0
2008	1	0
2009	1	0
Total	7	0

Statistics accurate as of match played 30 September 2009
