= Elias Freije =

Lebanese footballer

Personal information
- Full name: Elias Barakat Freije
- Date of birth: 28 March 1980 (age 46)
- Place of birth: Raiit, Lebanon
- Height: 1.85 m (6 ft 1 in)
- Position: Goalkeeper

Senior career*
Years	Team	Apps	(Gls)
1999–2007	Sagesse		(0)
2008–2010	Nejmeh		(0)
2010–2011	Akhaa Ahli Aley		(0)
2011–2012	Sagesse		(0)
2012–2013	Racing Beirut	1	(0)

International career
2009–2011	Lebanon	6	(0)
- * Club domestic league appearances and goals

Elias Barakat Freije (Arabic: الياس بركات فريجي; born 28 March 1980) is a Lebanese former footballer who played as a goalkeeper. He represented Lebanon internationally.

== Honours ==
Nejmeh

- Lebanese Premier League: 2008–09
