= Sergey Kaleutin =

Kyrgyzstani footballer (born 1986)

Sergei Kaleutin
Personal information
- Full name: Sergei Gennadyevich Kaleutin
- Date of birth: 20 June 1986 (age 40)
- Height: 1.73 m (5 ft 8 in)
- Position: Midfielder

Senior career*
Years	Team	Apps	(Gls)
2008–2010	Abdish-Ata Kant		
2011–2012	Astrakhan	17	(1)
2012–2013	Dordoi		
2014	Astrakhan	27	(0)
2015	Druzhba	4	(0)
2015–2016	Alga	0	(0)
2016	Astrakhan	8	(0)

International career^{‡}
2009–	Kyrgyzstan	5	(0)
- * Club domestic league appearances and goals as of 30 May 2016 ‡ National team caps and goals as of 13 August 2015

Sergei Gennadyevich Kaleutin (Russian: Серге́й Геннадьевич Калеутин; born 20 June 1986) is a Kyrgyzstani football midfielder. He also holds Russian citizenship.

== Career ==
He made his debut in the Russian Second Division for FC Astrakhan on 17 April 2011 in a game against FC Dynamo Stavropol.

Kaleutin signed for FC Dordoi Bishkek in August 2012, before leaving the club in a year later on 21 August 2013.

== Career statistics ==
=== International ===
Kyrgyzstan national team
Year	Apps	Goals
2009	4	0
2010	1	0
Total	5	0

Statistics accurate as of match played 21 February 2010
