= Artem Muladjanov =

Kyrgyzstani footballer

Personal information
- Date of birth: 4 February 1988 (age 38)
- Place of birth: Kyrgyzstan
- Position: Midfielder
| 2007–2010 | Dordoi Bishkek | | |
| 2011–2016 | Alga Bishkek | | |

International career^{‡}
| Years | Team | Apps | (Gls) |
| 2007–2011 | Kyrgyzstan | 7 | (0) |
- ‡ National team caps and goals as of 28 July 2011

Artem Muladjanov, born 4 February 1988, is a retired Kyrgyzstani footballer who is a midfielder, last played for Alga Bishkek. His brother Artur, also played for the same club.

== International career ==
He was a member of the Kyrgyzstan national football team.
