= Maksim Agapov =

Kyrgyzstani footballer (born 1988)

Personal information
- Date of birth: 20 March 1988 (age 38)
- Place of birth: Kyrgyzstan
- Height: 1.85 m (6 ft 1 in)
- Position: Goalkeeper

Team information
- Current team: Dordoi Bishkek

Senior career*
Years	Team	Apps	(Gls)
2007–2009	Neftchi Kochkor-Ata		
2009–2011	Abdish-Ata Kant		
2012	Xorazm		
2013	Dordoi Bishkek		
2014	Alga Bishkek		
2014–	Dordoi Bishkek		

International career^{‡}
2007 –	Kyrgyzstan	10	(0)
- * Club domestic league appearances and goals ‡ National team caps and goals as of 1 October 2014

Maksim Agapov (ru: Максим Агапов; born 20 March 1988) is a Kyrgyzstani footballer who plays as a goalkeeper for Xorazm FK Urganch. He previously played for Neftchi Kochkor-Ata, but after the dissolution of the club, he moved to his current club.

== Career ==
=== Club ===
In September 2014, Agapov returned to Dordoi Bishkek.

=== International ===
He is a member of the Kyrgyzstan national football team.

== Career statistics ==
=== International ===
Kyrgyzstan national team
Year	Apps	Goals
2007	4	0
2008	2	0
2009	2	0
2010	0	0
2011	0	0
2012	1	0
2013	1	0
2014	0	0
2015	0	0
Total	10	0

Statistics accurate as of match played 21 March 2013

== Honours ==
=== Individual ===
- Goalkeeper of the year (1): 2009
