= Wael Ayan =

Syrian footballer (born 1985)

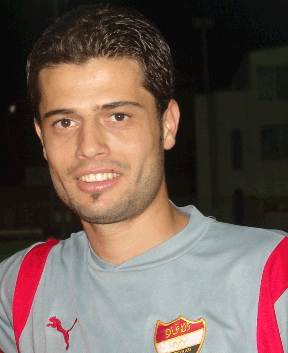
- Ayan with Al-Ittihad in 2010

Personal information
- Full name: Wael Ayan
- Date of birth: 13 June 1985 (age 41)
- Place of birth: Aleppo, Syria
- Height: 1.71 m (5 ft 7 in)
- Position: Midfielder

Senior career*
Years	Team	Apps	(Gls)
2003–2010	Al-Ittihad	154	(34)
2010–2012	Al-Faisaly	46	(7)
2012–2013	Najran SC	17	(5)
2014–2015	Al Ittihad Kalba	12	(2)
2018	Mohammedan	1	(0)

International career^{‡}
2005–2015	Syria	47	(1)
- * Club domestic league appearances and goals as of 1 May 2011 ‡ National team caps and goals as of 26 March 2015

Wael Ayan (Arabic: وائل عيان; born June 13, 1985, in Aleppo, Syria) is a Syrian footballer. He currently playing for Kolkata's club Mohammedan. He plays as a midfielder, wearing the number 14 for the Syrian national football team.

== International career ==
=== Appearances in major competitions ===
Team	Competition	Category	Appearances		Goals	Team record
Team	Competition	Category	Start	Sub	Goals	Team record
Syria	AFC Asian Cup 2011	Senior	3	0	0	Group Stage

== Honours ==
Al-Ittihad Aleppo

- Syrian League: 2005
- Syrian Cup: 2005, 2006
- AFC Cup: 2010

Syria

- Nehru Cup runner-up: 2007, 2009
