= Hamzeh Al Aitoni =

Syrian footballer (born 1986)

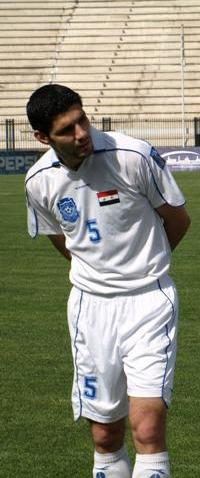
- Al Aitoni in 2009

Personal information
- Full name: Hamzeh Al Aitoni
- Date of birth: 16 January 1986 (age 40)
- Place of birth: Damascus, Syria
- Height: 1.81 m (5 ft 11 in)
- Position: Defender

Team information
- Current team: Al-Nidal

Senior career*
Years	Team	Apps	(Gls)
2004–2011	Al-Majd	?	(?)
2012	Al-Yarmouk	10	(0)
2012–2014	Zeravani SC		
2014–2015	Al-Nidal		
2015–2016	Salalah SC		
2016–2018	Al-Nidal		

International career
	Syria U-19	?	(?)
2003–2005	Syria U-20	?	(?)
2007–2008	Syria U-23	?	(?)
2004–2012	Syria	11	(0)
- * Club domestic league appearances and goals

Hamzeh Al Aitoni (Arabic: حمزة أيتوني; born 16 January 1986 in Damascus, Syria) is a Syrian former footballer who last played as a defender for Al-Nidal. He competed in the Syrian Premier League and is a member of the Syria national football team.

Aitoni was a part of the Syria U-19 that finished in Fourth place at the 2004 AFC U-19 Championship in Malaysia and he was a part of the Syria U-20 at the 2005 FIFA U-20 World Cup in the Netherlands. He played against Canada and Italy in the group-stage of the FIFA U-20 World Cup and against Brazil in the Round of 16.

== Honour and Titles ==
=== National team ===
- AFC U-19 Championship 2004: Fourth place
- FIFA U-20 World Cup 2005: Round of 16
- Nehru Cup: 2009 Runner-up
