= Renedy Singh =

Indian footballer

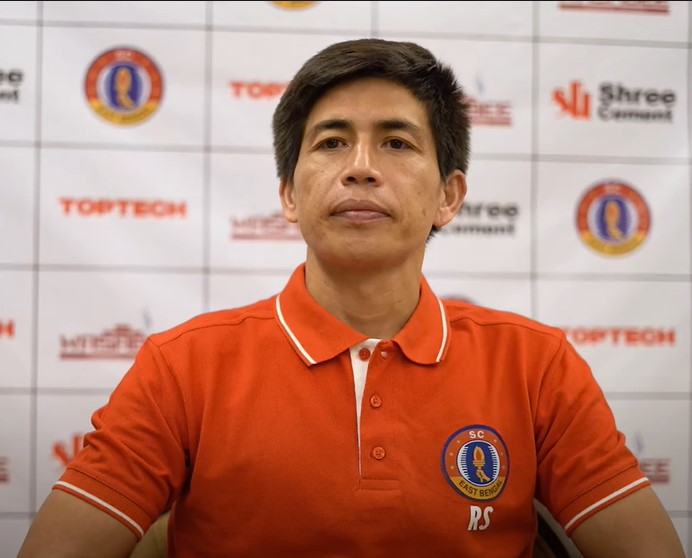
- Singh as manager of East Bengal in 2022

Personal information
- Full name: Renedy Singh Potsangbam
- Date of birth: 20 June 1979 (age 47)
- Place of birth: Imphal, Manipur, India
- Height: 1.76 m (5 ft 9 in)
- Position: Midfielder

Team information
- Current team: Bengaluru FC (Assistant)

Youth career
- 1997–2000: East Bengal

Senior career*
Years	Team	Apps	(Gls)
1996–2000	East Bengal FC	120	(24)
2000–2004	Mohun Bagan AC	130	(36)
2004–2005	Chirag United SC	38	(18)
2005–2008	JCT FC	92	(12)
2008–2010	East Bengal FC	66	(14)
2011–2012	United Sikkim	34	(6)
2012–2013	Shillong Lajong	30	(12)
2014–2015	Kerala Blasters FC	34	(8)
2015	→ CSKA Sofia (loan)	16	(2)
Total		560	(132)

International career
2000-2002	India U23	18	(4)
1998–2012	India	78	(12)

Managerial career
- 2015–2016: Pune City (assistant)
- 2019–2020: NEROCA
- 2022–2023: East Bengal (assistant)
- 2023–2024: Bengaluru (assistant)
- 2024–2025: Bengaluru (interim)
- 2025–2026: Bengaluru
- 2026–: Bengaluru (assistant)
- * Club domestic league appearances and goals

Renedy Singh Potsangbam (Meitei: Potsangbam Renedy Singh, born 20 June 1979) is an Indian professional football coach and former football midfielder. He is currently assistant coach at Bengaluru.

Singh was elected president of the Football Players' Association of India in 2014.

== Club career ==
Like many other Indian internationals, Renedy is a graduate of the Tata Football Academy in Jamshedpur. He spent six years there before signing his first professional contract with Kolkata giants East Bengal in 1997. Renedy's performances from midfield with the Red and Gold brigade quickly earned him his first senior international cap in 1999, when he was only 20.

By 2000, Renedy established himself as one of the best freekick takers in the country and was signed by Mohun Bagan. The midfielder played an influential role in their 2001-02 National League triumph. Injuries led to a dip in his form, leading to his departure from Mohun Bagan in 2004. He subsequently joined Chirag United (then known as Everyday) who were not in the top flight.

After a season at Chirag United, Renedy joined JCT FC in 2005. Renedy and Sunil Chhetri were prominent figures in the JCT squad, and played a key role in helping the finish second and third in National Football League 2006-2007 and I-League 2007–08.

Renedy joined East Bengal for the second time in his career in 2008, but was never a regular because of injuries and lack of match fitness. However, he was able to play a big role in a number of Kolkata derbies, by providing assists with his set-piece delivery. While at East Bengal in 2009, his team-mate Sunil Chhetri claimed that Renedy was "the best midfielder in the country" and was also "the most under-rated".

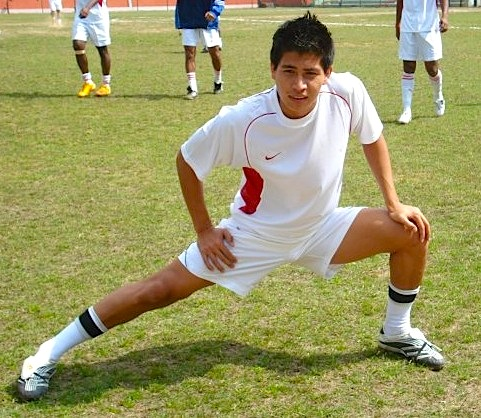
Singh in training in 2008

After a forgettable 2010 season with East Bengal, he was released by the club. After representing India in the 2011 AFC Asian Cup, he agreed a contract with Baichung Bhutia's club United Sikkim FC in the I-League 2nd Division.

On 16 January 2011, Renedy signed for Shillong Lajong of the I-League. In 2012, Singh went on to attend trial with Norwegian Eliteserien club Tromsø IL.

On 27 February 2015, he joined Bulgarian side CSKA Sofia on loan from Kerala Blasters, being the first Indian to sign for a Bulgarian club. However, he did not make any official appearances for the team, which was facing serious financial difficulties at the time.

== International career ==
Renedy was a regular for India from 1998 until 2011, as his ability to cross the ball with both feet made him a valuable asset. He appeared in the 2002 World Cup Qualifiers, where the Indian team defeated teams like the UAE, Brunei and Yemen. India secured 11 points from 6 matches (the same as Yemen), but finished behind them due to an inferior goal difference.

He was a vital part of the Indian team that won the Nehru Cup International Football Tournament 2007 and also the 2008 AFC Challenge Cup. Renedy set up both Indian goals against Bahrain in the 2011 Asian Cup in an eventual 5–2 loss.

== Managerial history ==
On 12 March 2019, Singh was appointed manager of I-League club NEROCA. He later went on to ISL club East Bengal as assistant coach.

After his stint at East Bengal, Bengaluru FC roped in Renedy as their new assistant coach. Following the departure of Gerard Zaragoza on 14 November 2025, Renedy was announced as interim coach of the club. Eventually, on 14 January 2026, Bengaluru announced Renedy as the club's head coach for the 2026 season.

== Managerial statistics ==
As of 7 April 2026

Managerial record by team and tenure
Team	From	To	Record				
Team	From	To	P	W	D	L	Win %
Bengaluru (interim)	13 December 2023	13 December 2023	1	0	0	1	0.00
Bengaluru	21 January 2026	7 April 2026	7	4	2	1	57.14
Career total			8	4	2	2	50.00

== Honours ==
East Bengal

- Federation Cup: 1996
- IFA Shield: 1997, 2000
- Calcutta Football League: 1996, 1998, 1999, 2000

Mohun Bagan

- Sikkim Gold Cup: 2001

JCT Mills

- National Football League runner-up: 2006–07

United Sikkim

- I-League 2nd Division: 2012

India

- AFC Challenge Cup: 2008
- SAFF Championship: 2005, 2011; runner-up: 2008; third place: 2003
- Nehru Cup: 2007, 2009
- Afro-Asian Games silver medal: 2003

India U23

- LG Cup: 2002

Manipur

- Santosh Trophy: 2002–03

== See also ==
- List of Indian football players in foreign leagues
