= Pratap Singh (referee) =

Indian football referee (born 1971)

- Full name: Pratap Singh Patwal
- Born: 8 December 1971 (age 54); Dehradun, Uttarakhand, India

Domestic
Years	League	Role
2007–present	I-League	Assistant Referee
2008–present	I-League	Referee

International
Years	League	Role
2009–present	FIFA listed	Referee
2010–2016	AFC Elite Panel	Referee

Pratap Singh Patwal (born 8 December 1971) is an Indian football referee.

== Biography ==
Pratap is originally from the town of Dehradun, Uttarakhand. He served in the Indian Navy before voluntarily retiring.

== Refereeing career ==
Pratap is on the FIFA referees list and the Asian Football Confederation (AFC) Elite Refereeing Panel for 2012. He has been a FIFA referee since 2009. He made his debut in an international match between India and Yemen in Pune in 2010.

Pratap is a member of the Uttarakhand State Football Referee Association.

In October 2012 he became one of three Indian referees to be offered professional contracts. The AIFF contracted Pratap from October 2012 to May 2013. He was awarded AIFF Best Referee Award for 2013 and best referee for 2013–14 I-League.

== Refereeing Administrator ==
Starting from July 2019, Pratap was hired as refereeing Senior Manager of the Asian Football Confederation (AFC) and oversees all AFC Refereeing activities and development in the AFC Competitions. He resigned and joined the Indonesia Football Federation (PSSI) as Refereeing director in March 2024.
