= Ahmad Haj Mohamad =

Syrian footballer (born 1987)

Personal information
- Full name: Ahmad Khairuddin Haj Mohamad
- Date of birth: 31 January 1987 (age 39)
- Place of birth: Latakia, Syria
- Height: 1.78 m (5 ft 10 in)
- Position: Midfielder

Team information
- Current team: Hutteen

Youth career
- 1996–2006: Hutteen

Senior career*
Years	Team	Apps	(Gls)
2006–2009	Hutteen	?	(?)
2009–2012	Al-Ittihad	23	(5)
2012–2013	Shabab Al-Ordon	8	(3)
2013	Al-Sinaa	7	(0)
2013–2014	Salam Zgharta	21	(7)
2014	Al-Seeb	?	(0)
2015–	Hutteen		

International career
2009–	Syria	13	(0)
- * Club domestic league appearances and goals

Ahmad Khairuddin Haj Mohamad (Arabic: احمد خير الدين حاج محمد; born 31 January 1987), commonly known as Ahmad Haj Mohamad, is a Syrian footballer who plays for Hutteen SC in Syrian Premier League.

== Club career ==
=== Syria ===
Ahmad began his professional career with his parent club Hutteen in 2006. In October 2009, he moved to Syrian Premier League club Al-Ittihad Aleppo and helped them win the 2010 AFC Cup, Asia's second biggest club football tournament and also the 2010–11 Syrian Cup.

=== Jordan ===
In July 2012, he moved to Jordan and on 10 July 2014 he signed a one-year contract with Shabab Al-Ordon Club.

=== Iraq ===
In 2013, he moved to Iraq and on 11 February 2013 he signed a six-month contract with Al-Sinaa.

=== Lebanon ===
In August 2013, he moved to Lebanon and signed a one-year contract with Salam Zgharta.

=== Oman ===
In August 2014, he moved to Oman and on 27 August 2014 he signed a one-year contract with Al-Seeb Club of Oman Professional League.

=== Back to Syria ===
After a two-year spell outside Syria, he returned to Syria in 2015 and on 1 February 2015, he signed a six-month contract with his parent club, Hutteen SC.

== International career ==
He has been a regular for the Syria national football team since 2009. Senior national coach Fajr Ibrahim called him for the first time, and he debuted in a 5 June 2009 friendly against Sierra Leone. He came on as a substitute for Adel Abdullah in the second halftime.

== Honour and Titles ==
=== Club ===
Al-Ittihad

- Syrian Cup: 2011
- AFC Cup: 2010
