= Anwar Ali (footballer, born 1984) =

Indian footballer

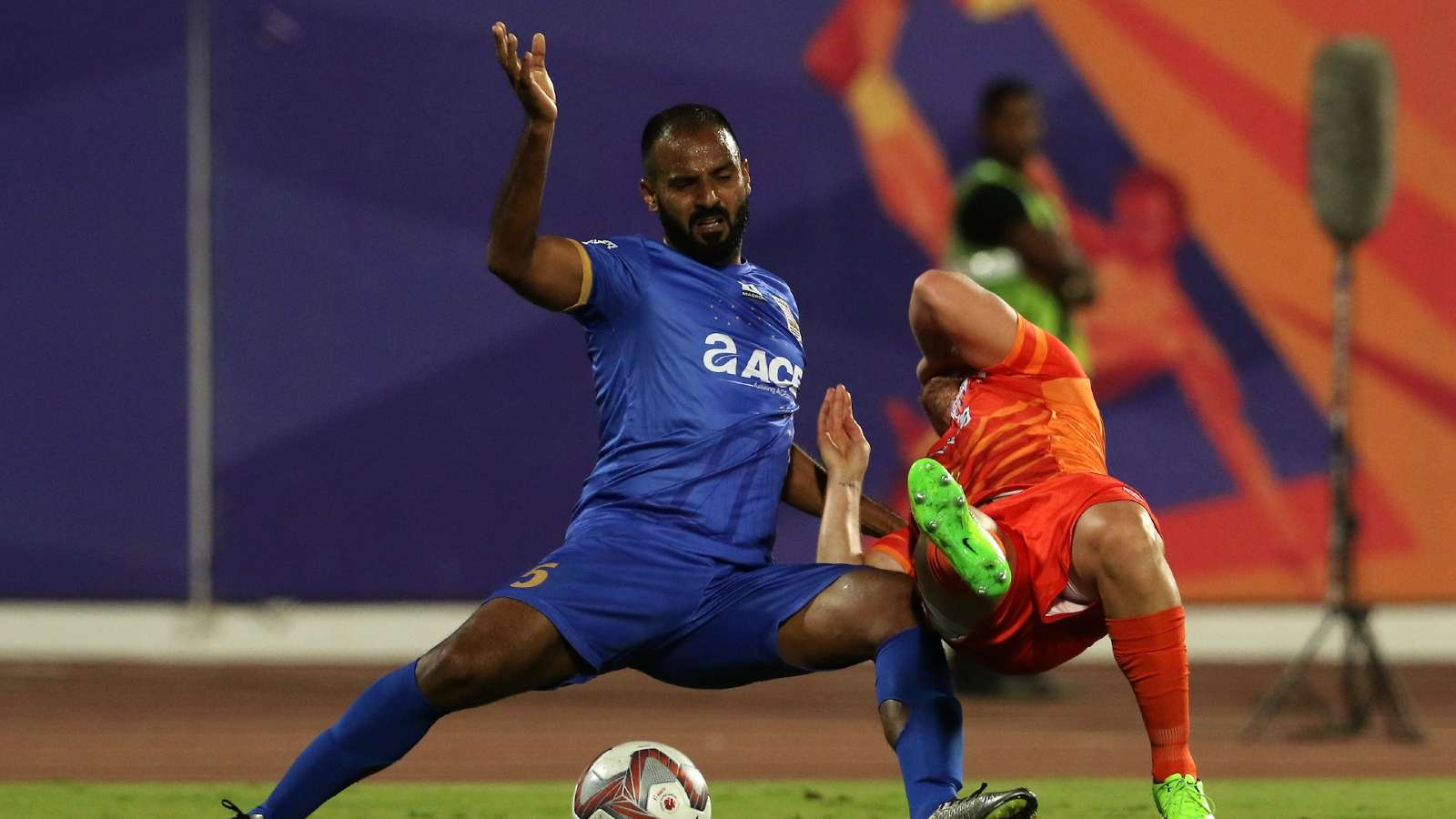
- Ali in 2015

Personal information
- Full name: Anwar Ali
- Date of birth: 24 September 1984 (age 42)
- Place of birth: Rurka Kalan, Punjab
- Height: 1.90 m (6 ft 3 in)
- Position: Centre back

Youth career
- Rurka Kalan Academy

Senior career*
Years	Team	Apps	(Gls)
- Punjab Police
2005–2009	JCT		
2009–2010	Dempo		
2010–2012	Mohun Bagan		
2012–2013	United Sikkim	23	(2)
2013–2014	Mumbai	23	(1)
2014–2015	Delhi Dynamos	17	(0)
2015	→ Mohun Bagan (loan)	7	(0)
2016	Mumbai	9	(0)
2016	Mumbai City	14	(0)
2017	East Bengal	5	(0)
2017–2018	ATK		
2018–2019	Mumbai City		
2019–2020	Punjab		
2021	Delhi FC		

International career
2008–2019	India	33	(0)
- * Club domestic league appearances and goals

Anwar Ali is an Indian former professional footballer.

== Career ==
Anwar joined the Rurka Kalan Academy of his village (Adampur), which is about 30 kilometres (19 mi) away from the city of Jalandhar when he was in school. Initially he used to play as a right-back for his school, DAV Jalandhar and impressed the national team scouts in the 2002 sub-junior nationals. Anwar was part of the 2004 Punjab Santosh Trophy team that lost to Kerala in the final; the same year he joined Punjab Police.

=== JCT ===
Joga Singh, assistant coach of Punjab Police, recognized Anwar's potential to play as a central defender because of his height, strong physique and strength in the air. From then on Anwar would start playing as a central defender and in 2005, he realized his dream of signing for JCT. The 2006–07 season would turn out to be a very important season in Anwar's career as it was in this campaign that he really came into the limelight. He was adjudged as the most promising footballer of the 2006 Durand Cup, where JCT reached the final and narrowly lost to Dempo. In the National League (now I-League), Anwar was one of the best defenders and his performances played a crucial role in JCT's runner-up finish.

=== Dempo ===
Ali signed with Dempo for the 2009-10 I-League season and was a regular for his team, featuring 18 times during the league but left at the end of the season.

=== Mohun Bagan ===
Anwar signed with Mohun Bagan for the 2010-11 I-League season and before the 2011 Asian Cup. Anwar had an impressive season, featuring 25 times at the heart of the defense for the Mariners.

=== United Sikkim ===
Ali signed for United Sikkim of the I-League in 2012. On 28 January, he scored with a superb scissors kick from an Ashish Chettri free kick against Pailan Arrows at Kalyani, West Bengal and gave the visitors the lead on the 74th minute, though substitute Tirthankar Sarkar equalized 6 minutes later to ensure level-pegging.

=== Mumbai FC ===
Anwar spent the 2013–14 I-League season with Mumbai, building a strong defensive partnership with promising youngster Sandesh Jhingan whom he knew from his time at United Sikkim, helping his side avoid relegation.

=== Delhi Dynamos ===
Anwar was snapped up by Indian Super League side Delhi Dynamos for the 2014 season. Anwar was a regular for his team and played all of his teams' 14 league fixtures.

=== Mohun Bagan ===
Anwar signed with Mohun Bagan for the 2014-15 I-League

=== East Bengal ===
On 11 December 2016 it was announced that Ali had signed with East Bengal for their I-League campaign after his stint with Mumbai City in the Indian Super League is over. In April 2017, he suffered a heart attack after a practise session and was admitted to a hospital.

=== ATK ===
Ali signed for Indian Super League franchise ATK ahead of the 2017–18 season.

== International ==
Anwar continued to improve the following season and finally got a call up to the national team squad. His first tournament was the 2008 SAFF Cup but the AFC Challenge Cup could be considered as his major breakthrough tournament as it was in this competition that he established himself as a regular. Anwar formed a formidable partnership with Gouramangi Singh at the heart of the central defence as India conceded only three goals in five matches.

The tall defender has been a first team regular ever since, helping India to retain the Nehru Cup title in 2009 and also featuring regularly in the international friendlies of 2010.

He was also in the 23-member squad selected for the 2011 Asian Cup in Qatar.

== Honours ==
India

- AFC Challenge Cup: 2008
- SAFF Championship runner-up: 2008
- Nehru Cup: 2009
