= Fajr Ibrahim =

Syrian footballer (born 1964)

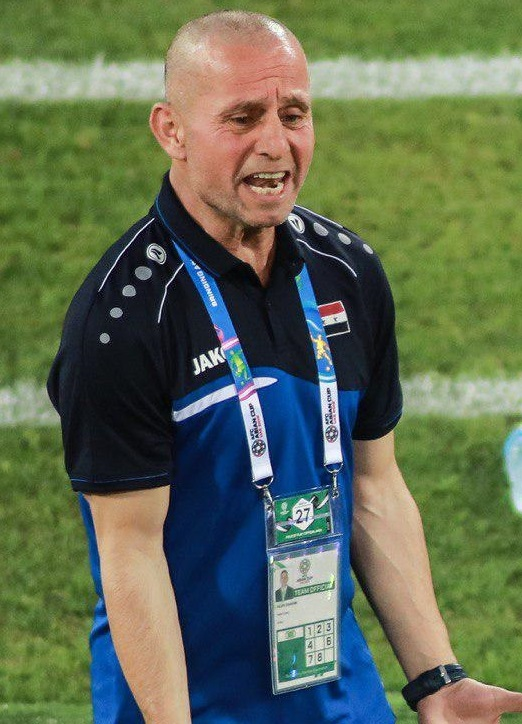
- Fajr Ibrahim in 2019

Personal information
- Full name: Fajr Ibrahim
- Date of birth: 22 June 1964 (age 62)
- Place of birth: Damascus, Syria
- Position: Left-back

Youth career
- 1976–1979: Al-Wahda

Senior career*
Years	Team	Apps	(Gls)
1979–1996	Al-Wahda		

International career
1981	Syria U20		
1982–1987	Syria		

Managerial career
- 2006–2008: Syria
- 2008–2010: Syria
- 2011–2012: Al-Shorta
- 2013: Duhok
- 2015–2016: Syria
- 2017–2018: Al-Minaa
- 2018: Kelantan
- 2019: Syria
- 2020–2021: Al-Horgelah
- 2021: Yemen
- 2024–2025: Al-Karamah
- * Club domestic league appearances and goals

Fajr Ibrahim (Arabic: فَجْر إِبْرَاهِيم; born 22 June 1964) is a Syrian football coach and former player.

== Club career ==
Fajr started playing in the Syrian League with Al-Wahda team in 1979. He remained with the club until he retired from the playing. He won the Syrian Cup in 1993 with Al-Wahda team and won the title of best left back in 1986 season.

== International career ==
Fajr played several international matches with Syria for five years from 1982 until 1987.

== Coaching career ==
He managed the Syrian first team more than 50 matches between 2006 and 2019. He did an emergency mission and replaced the German manager Bernd Stange in the last match for the team in 2019 Asian Cup against Australia. Many pundits referred that he had the UAE visa since the middle of December, so he could be ready to replace the manager if the things went wrong.

Widely unpopular with the fans and criticized by the media, Ibrahim is often considered one of the reasons for the Syria national team's poor results after their 2019 Asian Cup exit, citing his lack of achievements, and lack of vision, as some of his weakest traits, although Syria at that time had already in problem before Fajr took charge. However, he has repeatedly and openly refused to resign and has been kept as manager by the Syrian Federation, despite losing to many lesser-ranked and weaker teams, much to the bewilderment of both fans and journalists.

However, the sentiment changed surprisingly during the 2022 FIFA World Cup qualification – AFC second round. Syria, under the same command of Fajr Ibrahim, surprised the whole qualifiers by topping the group with five straight victories, including two important victories against rising Philippines, and a resounding 2–1 win in the UAE against China. However, he was later replaced by Tunisian coach Nabil Maâloul.

In September 2020, Ibrahim joined newly-promoted club Al-Horgelah. In September 2021, he was appointed as manager of Yemeni national team. In October 2024, he became the head coach of Al-Karamah. In April 2025, he parted ways with the latter by mutual consent, despite leading the league, and was succeeded by Mohammad Kwid.

== Managerial statistics ==
As of match played 19 November 2019

Team	Nat	From	To	Record				
Team	Nat	From	To	G	W	D	L	Win %
Syria	(Syria)	5 August 2006	26 March 2008	24	13	5	6	54.17
Syria	(Syria)	13 November 2008	13 September 2010	16	10	4	2	62.50
Al-Shorta	(Syria)	28 August 2011	10 April 2012	20	15	3	2	75.00
Duhok	(Iraq)	1 February 2013	4 December 2013	32	15	8	9	46.88
Syria	(Syria)	7 January 2015	30 March 2016	13	10	0	3	76.92
Al-Minaa	(Iraq)	8 September 2017	21 January 2018	10	2	7	1	20.00
Kelantan	(Malaysia)	21 March 2018	5 June 2018	6	1	1	4	16.67
Syria	(Syria)	11 January 2019	31 December 2019	18	7	4	7	38.89
Total				139	73	32	34	52.52

== Honours ==
=== Player ===
Al-Wahda

- Syrian Cup: 1993
- Syrian Super Cup: 1993

=== Manager ===
Al-Shorta

- Syrian Premier League: 2011–12

Syria

- Nehru Cup: 2007 and 2009 as a runner-up

=== Individual ===
- 1985–86 Syrian League: Best Left Back of the season
