= Surkumar Singh Irungbam =

Indian footballer (born 1983)

Surkumar Singh
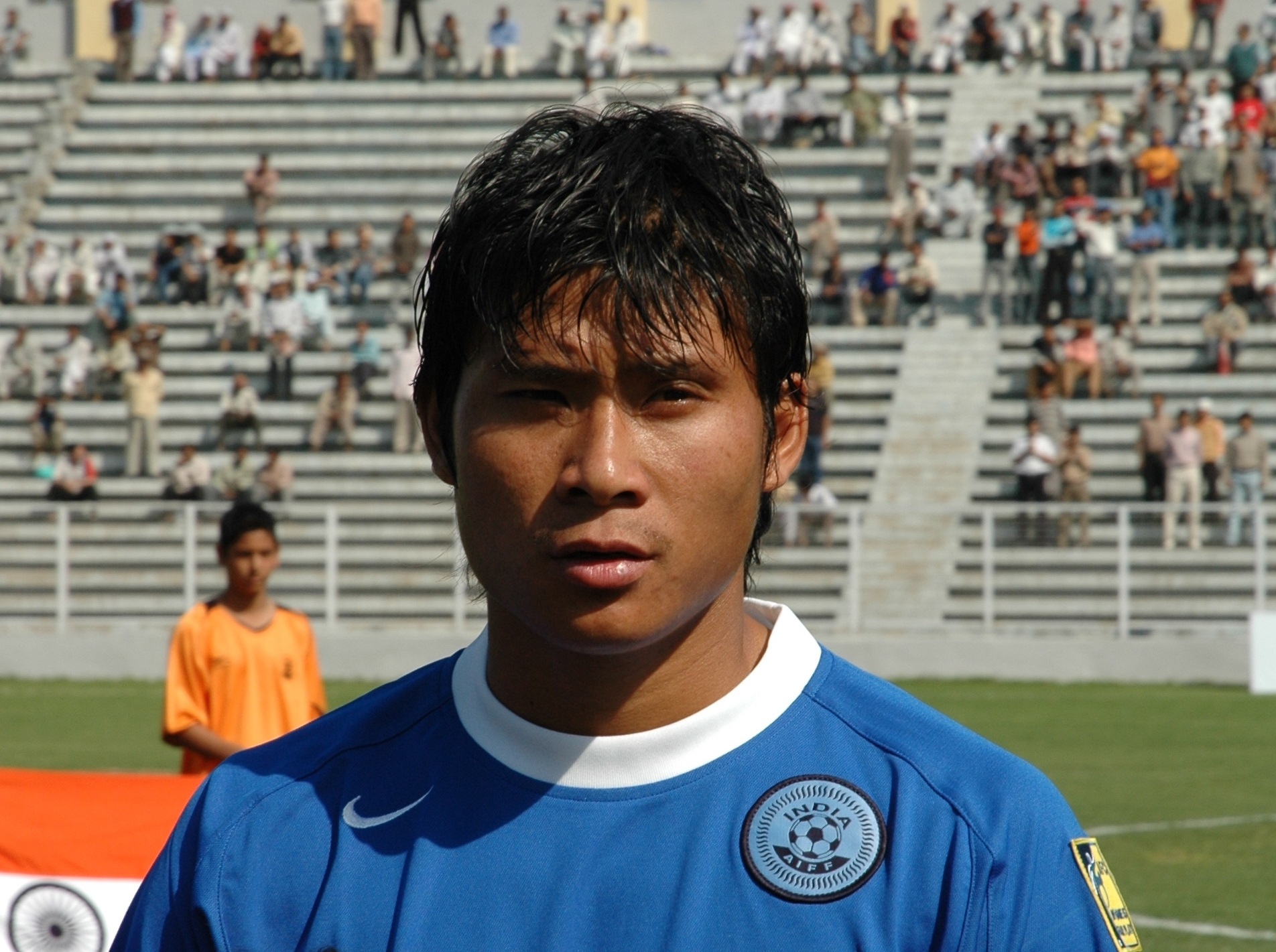

Personal information
- Full name: Surkumar Singh Irungbam
- Date of birth: 21 March 1983 (age 43)
- Place of birth: Imphal, India
- Height: 1.74 m (5 ft 8 1/2 in)
- Position: Right back

Team information
- Current team: Mumbai Tigers
- Number: 13

Senior career*
Years	Team	Apps	(Gls)
2000–2001	East Bengal	19	(2)
2001–2003	Mahindra United	34	(0)
2003–2004	East Bengal	0	(0)
2004–2007	Mahindra United	34	(0)
2007–2009	East Bengal	16	(0)
2009–2012	Mohun Bagan		(4)
2013–14	Mumbai Tigers	0	(0)
2014–	United Sikkim	6	(0)

International career
2006	India U23		
2001–2011	India	52	(2)
- * Club domestic league appearances and goals

Surkumar Singh Irungbam (Meitei: Irungbam Surkumar Singh, born 21 March 1983) is an Indian footballer who played for the India national football team as a defender. Graduated out of the prestigious Tata Football Academy in 2000, he played for the Kolkata giants East Bengal, and later for United Sikkim in the 2nd Division of I-League. After impressing at under-16 level while playing for Manipur under-16 despite being only 13, Surkumar was hired by Tata Football Academy. He spent four years in TFA and used to play as a center back. He also made his international debut in 2001 in the historic 1–0 win over UAE in a 2002 World Cup qualifier.

== Career ==
=== East Bengal ===
After signing his first professional contract with East Bengal, he was turned into a right back by then-East Bengal coach Syed Nayemuddin. That change brought the best out of Surkumar as he played a key role in East Bengal's first ever National League title.

=== Mahindra United ===
After just one season with the red and gold brigade, he joined Mahindra United. He won the Durand Cup with the Mumbai-based outfit but also tore his ligament there in a Mumbai League match.

=== East Bengal ===
Surkumar returned to East Bengal for his second spell and won the treble with them in 2003 - ASEAN Cup, National Football League (NFL) and Kolkata Premier League.

=== Mahindra United ===
Surkumar then joined Mahindra for the second time in his career and spent three successful seasons with the Mumbai club. The fullback won every major trophy with the Red Devils of India and was adjudged AIFF Player of the Year in 2006.

=== East Bengal ===
He rejoined East Bengal for this third spell and won the Federation Cup in 2007.

=== Mohun Bagan ===
Then in 2009, for the first time in his career Surkumar signed for Mohun Bagan. He had scored the only goal from a Snehasish Chakraborty corner, as debutantes Shillong Lajong F.C. had thrashed the century-old club 1–4 at Kolkata.

=== Mumbai Tigers ===
In the 2013 I-League 2nd Division, he had opened the scoring for the Mumbai Tigers F.C. in their last match against Bhawanipore F.C. in the 3–5 loss.

He won the Kolkata League with Mohun Bagan in his first season and will be an important player for them once he returns from international duty. For the national team, Surkumar has been a regular since the 2005 SAFF Cup triumph. The attacking right wingback has easily been India's best player in that position in the last decade. Unlike very few fullbacks in the country, Surkumar also has the ability to score goals, especially from long range. He has four international goals to his name with the most recent one coming in the 3–6 defeat against Yemen in Pune.

=== United Sikkim F.C. ===
In 2014, he has joined United Sikkim F.C.

== Honours ==
East Bengal

- IFA Shield: 2000
- ASEAN Club Championship: 2003

India

- AFC Challenge Cup: 2008
- SAFF Championship: 2005
- Nehru Cup: 2007, 2009

Individual

- AIFF Player of the Year: 2006
