= Nehru Cup =

International football tournament

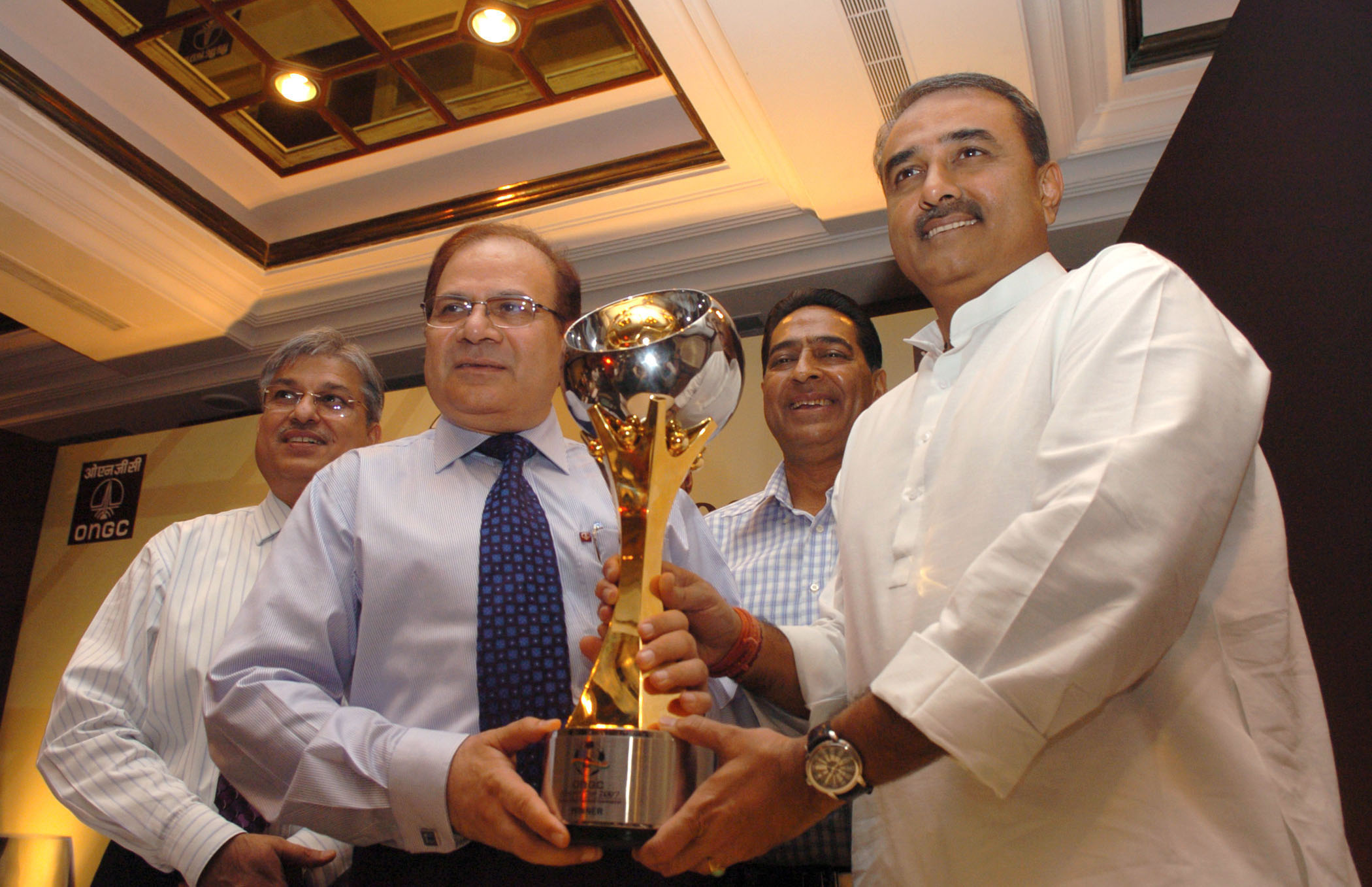
- The new Nehru Cup trophy being unveiled by then-Minister for Civil Aviation, Praful Patel, in New Delhi, 6 August 2009.
- Organiser(s): AIFF
- Founded: 1982; 44 years ago
- Abolished: 2012; 14 years ago
- Region: India
- Teams: 5 (2012)
- Related competitions: Tri-Nation Series; Intercontinental Cup
- Last champions: India (3rd title)
- Most championships: Soviet Union (4 titles)

The Nehru Cup was an international football tournament organised by the All India Football Federation (AIFF), named after the first Prime Minister of India Jawaharlal Nehru. It was launched in 1982, but was not held from 1998 to 2006. After the trophy was won by Iraq in 1997, it was reinstated only in 2007, before officially being last held in 2012 and replaced in 2017.

== History ==
=== Overview (1982–2012) ===
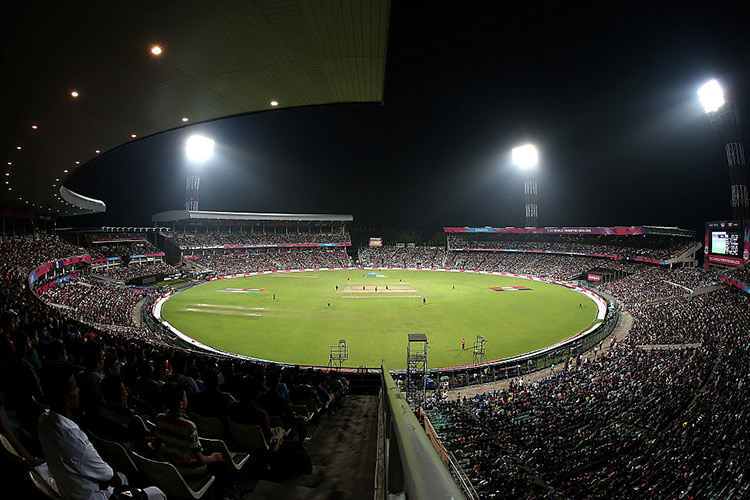
The iconic Eden Gardens stadium, hosted all matches of the inaugural edition of Nehru Cup.

Nehru Cup was launched in 1982 by the All India Football Federation (AIFF) in memory of India's first Prime Minister Jawaharlal Nehru, held in Calcutta. Known as "ONGC (Oil and Natural Gas Corporation) Nehru Cup" for sponsorship reasons, it was held once every 2 years. The first edition was inaugurated by Nehru's daughter, Prime Minister Indira Gandhi and Uruguay lifted the trophy with a 2–0 win against China. It was not held from 1998 to 2007.

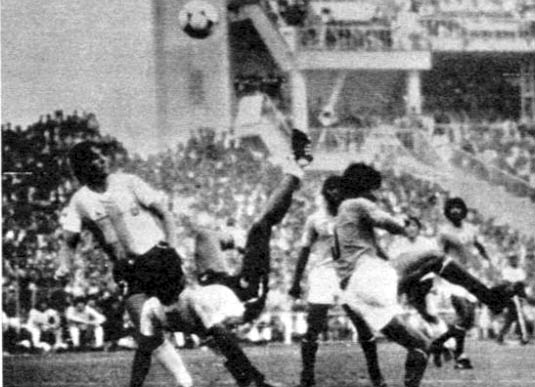
India vs Argentina match at the Eden Gardens during the 1984 edition

The tournament was mainly started to popularise football in India, and the hosts won for the first time in 2007 beating Syria.

North Korea became the first Asian team to win the trophy in 1993 edition, defeating Romania B 2–0.

=== Nehru Club Cup (1990) ===
In 1990, the "Jawaharlal Nehru Centenary Club Cup" (to celebrate the birth centenary of Nehru) was organized in place of Nehru Cup, which became the only international club tournament held in the country. The tournament was won by Paraguayan side Club Olimpia after their 1–0 win against Argentine club Club de Gimnasia y Esgrima La Plata, in which Luis Monzón scored the winner.

Mohammedan Sporting Club was the only Indian team to qualify for semi-finals. They defeated Zambia national team 1–0 and FC Metalist 1925 Kharkiv 1–0, before losing 2–0 to Argentine side Gimnasia Esgrima. In the semi-final, Mohammedan lost 1–0 to the eventual champions, Paraguayan outfit Club Olimpia.

- Official awards:
  - Taj Bengal Trophy for player of the tournament: Emeka Ezeugo
  - Director's Special Trophy for top scorer: Gabriel González

== TV coverage ==
The first Nehru Cup in 1982 was covered by Prabir Roy with a 5 on-line camera operation. This was long before Doordarshan started the same during the Delhi Asian Games in November 1982. This was apparently the first colour television broadcast in India.

== Absence, revival and replacement ==
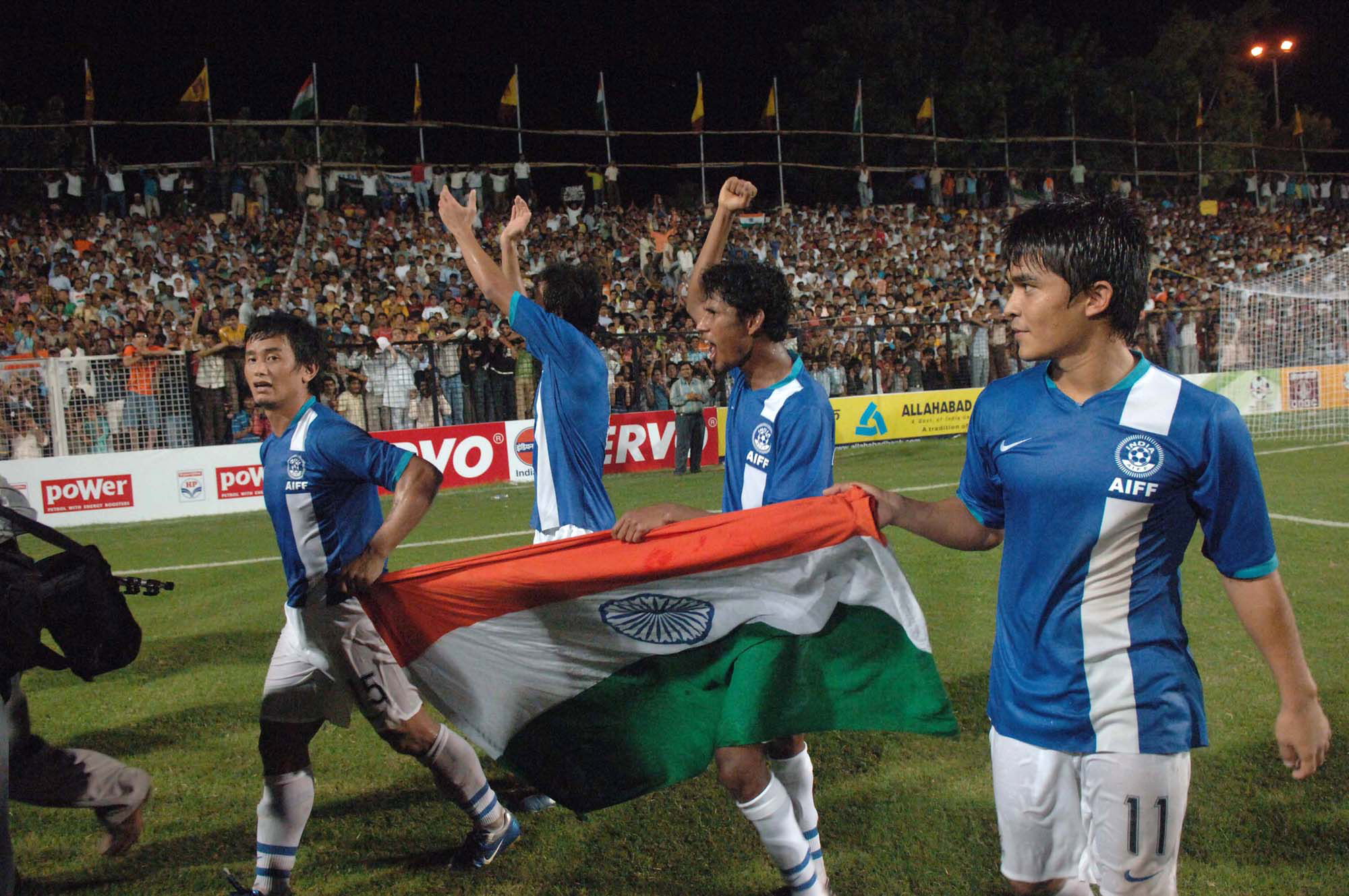
Indian players celebrating their first Nehru Cup win in 2007 at the Ambedkar Stadium in New Delhi. The tournament was revived in that year

The tournament was shelved after 1997 due to lack of sponsorship and other reasons. It was revived in 2007 mainly due to persuasion by the former coach of India national football team – Bob Houghton. The original rolling trophy could not be recovered from Iraq, and a new trophy was designed.

The tournament held during 2007 was called the ONGC Nehru Cup, to acknowledge sponsorship from the Oil and Natural Gas Corporation. The 2007 Nehru Cup took place from 17 to 29 August 2007 with Syria, Kyrgyzstan, India, Cambodia and Bangladesh as participating nations where India won their first title after hosting it for the last couple of decades defeating the much higher ranked Syria in the final by a 1–0 margin, on a goal scored by N. P. Pradeep in the 44th minute on a back pass from Bhaichung Bhutia.

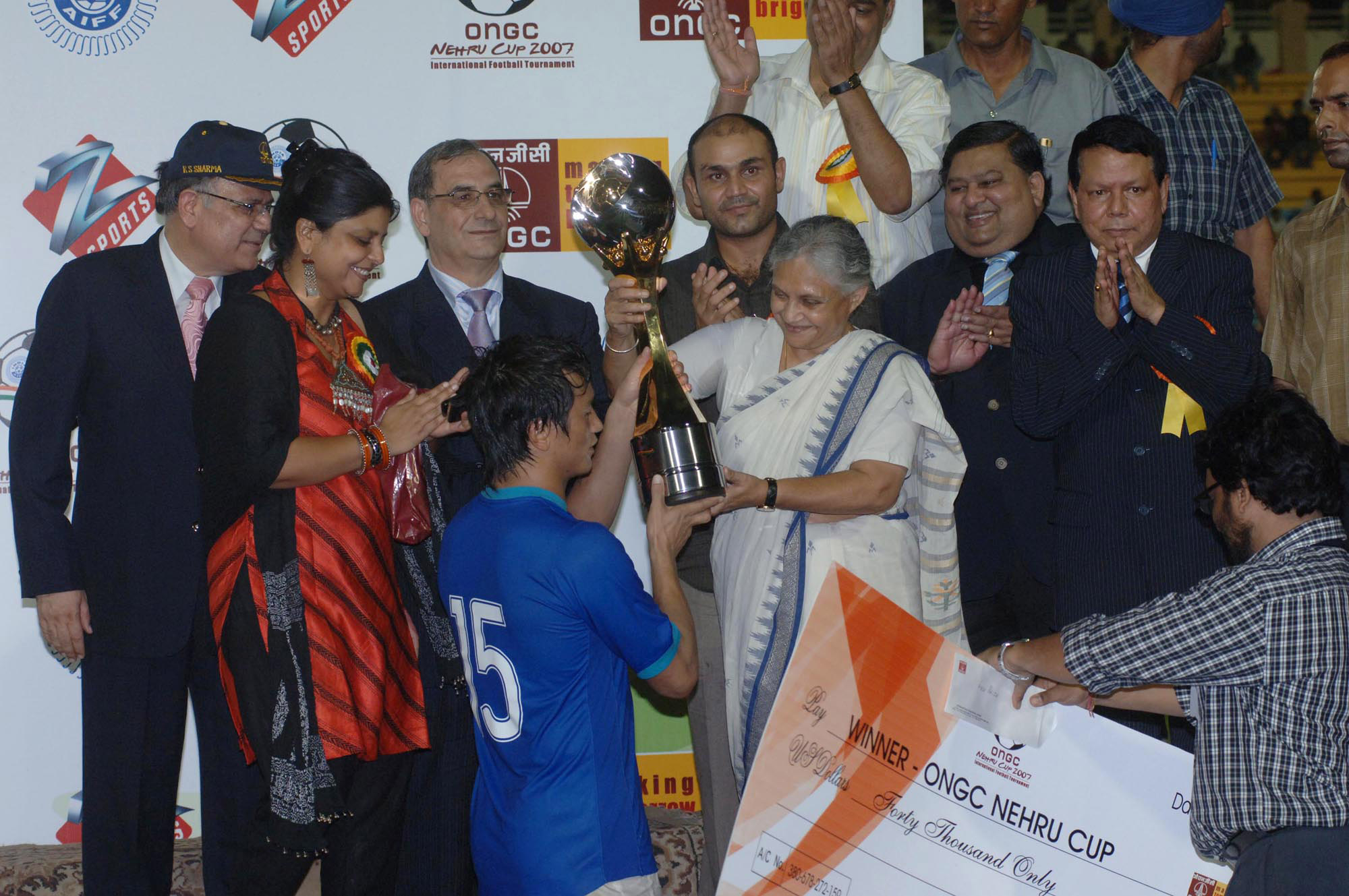
The Chief Minister of Delhi Sheila Dixit presenting the ONGC Nehru Cup to the India captain Bhaichung Bhutia, August 29, 2007.

The 2009 Nehru Cup took place in New Delhi from 19 to 31 August 2009. After the participation of Palestine was cancelled by the AIFF, the tournament was changed into a round-robin format with five teams playing each other and the top two clashing in the final. India defeated Syria by 5–4 on penalties after a 1–1 draw in the final on 31 August 2009.

The 2012 Nehru Cup was the 15th edition of the Nehru Cup and 3rd Nehru Cup since it was revived in 2007. It was held from 22 August to 2 September. The tournament was hosted in New Delhi, India. A total of 5 teams participated in the tournament through being invited by the All India Football Federation. The final match happened between India and Cameroon and India won the match in penalty shoot out 5–4 after the match ended 2–2 after 120 minutes of play.

Hopes to have another tournament in 2014 were shelved in August 2014 due to the AIFF not being able to pursue capital investment. AIFF revealed on 17 May 2016 that it plans to replace Nehru Cup with a new Intercontinental Cup.

== Results ==
Ed.	Year	Host city	Final			Third-place match			Num. teams
Ed.	Year	Host city	Winner	Score	Runner-up	3rd place	Score	4th place	Num. teams
1	1982	Calcutta	Uruguay	2–0	China	South Korea	– (Note: Round-robin format, no third match held.)	Italy Amateur	6
2	1983	Kochi	Hungary Olympic	2–1	China U-19	Cameroon XI	–	Romania U-21	7
3	1984	Calcutta	Poland	1–0	China	Argentina	–	(Hungary); Vasas Budapest	6
4	1985	Kochi	Soviet Union	2–1	Yugoslavia	Morocco	–	South Korea Youth	8
5	1986	Thiruvananthapuram	Soviet Union B	1–0	China	East Germany Olympic	–	Peru	6
6	1987	Kozhikode	Soviet Union Olympic	2–0	Bulgaria Olympic	Denmark League	–	East Germany Olympic	8
7	1988	Siliguri	Soviet Union Olympic	2–0	Poland Olympic	Bulgaria Olympic	–	Hungary Olympic	8
8	1989	Margao	Hungary Olympic	2–0	Soviet Union U-21	North Korea	–	Iraq Youth	6
9	1991	Thiruvananthapuram	Romania	3–1	Hungary	Soviet Union	–	China	6
10	1993	Chennai	North Korea	2–0	Romania B	Cameroon	–	Finland	7
11	1995	Kolkata	Iraq	1–0	Russia U-20	Thailand	–	India	5
12	1997	Kochi	Iraq	3–1	Uzbekistan U-19	China U-19	2–1	India	5
13	2007	New Delhi	India	1–0	Syria	Kyrgyzstan	–	Bangladesh	5
14	2009	New Delhi	India	1–1 (a.e.t.) (5–4 p)	Syria	Kyrgyzstan	–	Lebanon	5
15	2012	New Delhi	India	2–2 (a.e.t.) (5–4 p)	Cameroon	Maldives	–	Syria	5

== Medal summary ==
Rank	Nation	Gold	Silver	Bronze	Total
1	Russia	4	2	1	7
2	India	3	0	0	3
3	Hungary	2	1	0	3
4	Iraq	2	0	0	2
5	Poland	1	1	0	2
5	Romania	1	1	0	2
7	North Korea	1	0	1	2
8	Uruguay	1	0	0	1
9	China	0	4	1	5
10	Syria	0	2	0	2
11	Cameroon	0	1	2	3
12	Bulgaria	0	1	1	2
13	Uzbekistan	0	1	0	1
13	Yugoslavia	0	1	0	1
15	Kyrgyzstan	0	0	2	2
15	South Korea	0	0	2	2
17	Argentina	0	0	1	1
17	Denmark	0	0	1	1
17	East Germany	0	0	1	1
17	Finland	0	0	1	1
17	Maldives	0	0	1	1
17	Morocco	0	0	1	1
17	Thailand	0	0	1	1
Totals (23 entries)		15	15	17	47

== See also ==
- Tri-Nation Series
- Intercontinental Cup
- List of association football competitions
