= India national football team results (2010–2019) =

Results of India national football team from 2010 to 2019.

Summary Matches 382–486
Games	Won	Draw	Lost	GF	GA	Win %
105	40	20	45	153	162	39.05%
Biggest win
India 6–1 Laos 2 June 2016
India 5–0 Chinese Taipei 1 June 2018
Biggest defeat
India 1–9 Kuwait 14 November 2010
Honours
(gold) 2011 SAFF Championship, India
(gold) 2015 SAFF Championship, India
(silver) 2013 SAFF Championship, Nepal
(silver) 2018 SAFF Championship, Bangladesh
← 2000–09				2020–present →		

Key
Indicates India national football team won the match
Indicates the match ended in draw
Indicates India national football team lost the match

== 2010 ==
4 September
International Friendly

Thailand	1–0	India
Chaikamdee 73'	Report

Yamaha Stadium, Nonthaburi, Thailand

8 September
18:30 IST
International Friendly

India	1–2	Thailand
Thamsatchanan 54' (o.g.)	Report	Winothai 48'; Keawsombat 64'

Ambedkar Stadium, New Delhi, India

15 September
18:30 IST
International Friendly

India	2–0	Namibia
Wadoo 26'; Pereira 54'	Report

Ambedkar Stadium, New Delhi, India
Referee: Pratap Singh (India)

4 October
18:00 IST
International Friendly

India	0–1	Hong Kong
	Report	Li Hai Keung 76'

Balewadi Sports Complex, Pune, India
Referee: Pratap Singh (India)

8 October
19:00 IST
International Friendly

India	3–1	Vietnam
Chhetri 25', 48', 72'	Report	Thanh 62' (pen.)

Balewadi Sports Complex, Pune, India
Referee: Dinesh Nair (India)

13 October
19:00 IST
International Friendly

India	3–6	Yemen
Al-Dali 20' (o.g.); Yadav 49'; Surkumar 90+2'	Report	H. Thabit 9'; Baleid 28'; Al-Worafi 61'; Al-Sasi 77', 88'; Y. Al-Haj 90+3'

Balewadi Sports Complex, Pune, India
Referee: Pratap Singh (India)

11 November
International Friendly

Iraq	2–0	India
Karim 17' (pen.); Mahdi Karim 66'	Report

Al-Shaab Stadium, Baghdad, Iraq

14 November
International Friendly

India	1–9	Kuwait
Rafi 71'	Report	Nasser 19'; Al-Mutawa 24', 55', 66', 90'; J. Al-Ataiqi 28' (pen.); Al-Enezi 51'; Khalaf 56'; T. Al-Enezi 75'

Al Nahyan Stadium, Abu Dhabi, United Arab Emirates

18 November
International Friendly

United Arab Emirates	5–0	India
Al-Kass 14'; Murbarek 35'; Al-Wehaibi 60', 72'; Jumaa 71'	Report

Zabeel Stadium, Abu Dhabi, United Arab Emirates

== 2011 ==
10 January
16:15 AST
2011 AFC Asian Cup

India	0–4	Australia
	Report	Cahill 11', 65'; Kewell 24'; Holman 45+2'

Jassim Bin Hamad Stadium, Doha, Qatar
Attendance: 9,783
Referee: Abdullah Al Hilali (Oman)

14 January
19:15 AST
2011 AFC Asian Cup

Bahrain	5–2	India
Aaish 8' (pen.); Abdullatif 16', 20', 35', 77'	Report	G. Singh 10'; Chhetri 53'

Jassim Bin Hamad Stadium, Doha, Qatar
Attendance: 11,032
Referee: Subkhiddin Mohd Salleh (Malaysia)

18 January
16:15 AST
2011 AFC Asian Cup

South Korea	4–1	India
Dong-won 6', 23'; Ja-cheol 9'; Heung-min 81'	KFA	Chhetri 12' (pen.)

Al Gharafa Stadium, Doha, Qatar
Attendance: 11,366
Referee: Khalil Al Ghamdi (Saudi Arabia)

21 March
19:30 MST
AFC CC Qualifier

India	3–0	Chinese Taipei
Lalpekhlua 32'; Chhetri 76'; Jewel 88'	Report

MBPJ Stadium, Petaling Jaya, Malaysia
Attendance: 50
Referee: Mohammad Nafeez Abdul Wahab (Malaysia)

23 March
16:00 MST
AFC CC Qualifier

Pakistan	1–3	India
Mehmood 32'	Report	Lalpekhlua 67', 90+4'; Dias 90'

MBPJ Stadium, Petaling Jaya, Malaysia
Attendance: 100
Referee: Mohammad Al Rashidat (Jordan)

25 March
16:00 MST
AFC CC Qualifier

Turkmenistan	1–1	India
Çoňkaýew 52' (pen.)	Report	Lalpekhlua 60'

MBPJ Stadium, Petaling Jaya, Malaysia
Attendance: 200
Referee: Mohammad Nafeez Abdul Wahab (Malaysia)

10 July
International Friendly

Maldives	1–1	India
Mukhthar 45'	Report	Chhetri 18'

Rasmee Dhandu Stadium, Male, Maldives

23 July
20:00 UTC+4
FIFA WC Qualifier

United Arab Emirates	3–0	India
Al-Kamali 21' (pen.); Al-Shehhi 29' (pen.); Al Hammadi 82'	FIFA

Sheikh Khalifa International Stadium, Al-Ain, United Arab Emirates
Attendance: 3,179
Referee: Banjar Al-Dosari (Qatar)

28 July
19:00 UTC+5:30
FIFA WC Qualifier

India	2–2	United Arab Emirates
Lalpekhula 73'; G. Singh 90+2'	FIFA	Al-Shehhi 39'; Al-Wehaibi 71'

Ambedkar Stadium, New Delhi, India
Attendance: 13,000
Referee: Abdul Malik Bashir (Singapore)

21 August
International Friendly

Trinidad and Tobago	3–0	India
John 19' (pen.); Roberts 47', 85'	Report

Hasely Crawford Stadium, Port of Spain, Trinidad and Tobago
Referee: Courtney Campbell (Jamaica)

24 August
International Friendly

Guyana	2–1	India
Mills 17'; Moore 63'	Report	Dias 36'

Providence Stadium, Providence, Guyana

13 November
International Friendly

India	1–1	Malaysia
Nabi 88'	Report	Safiq 42'

Indira Gandhi Athletic Stadium, Guwahati, India
Attendance: 20,000
Referee: Stanley Lancaster (Guyana)

16 November
International Friendly

India	3–2	Malaysia
Chhetri 39', 53'; Lalpekhlua 47'	Report	Safee 45', 60'

Salt Lake Stadium, Kolkata, India

29 November
International Friendly

India	0–5	Zambia
	Report	Chisenga 15'; J. Mushumba 55'; M. Bwalya 69', 73', 90'

Fatorda Stadium, Goa, India

3 December
15:00 IST
2011 SAFF Cup

India	1–1	Afghanistan
Chhetri 10'	Report	Arezou 5'

Jawaharlal Nehru Stadium, New Delhi, India
Referee: Nagor Amir Noor Mohamed (Malaysia)

5 December
18:00 IST
2011 SAFF Cup

India	5–0	Bhutan
Nabi 29'; Miranda 44', 58'; Chhetri 69', 84'	Report

Jawaharlal Nehru Stadium, New Delhi, India
Referee: Sukhbir Singh (Singapore)

7 December
18:00 IST
2011 SAFF Cup

India	3–0	Sri Lanka
Lalpekhlua 50'; Chhetri 69'; B. Warakagoda 90' (o.g.)	Report

Jawaharlal Nehru Stadium, New Delhi, India
Referee: Timur Faizullin (Kyrgyzstan)

9 December
15:00 IST
2011 SAFF Cup

India	3–1	Maldives
Nabi 24'; Chhetri 70' (pen.), 90+1'	Report	Qasim 60'

Jawaharlal Nehru Stadium, New Delhi, India
Referee: Timur Faizullin (Kyrgyzstan)

11 December
18:00 IST
2011 SAFF Cup

India	4–0	Afghanistan
Chhetri 70' (pen.); Miranda 79'; Lalpekhlua 80'; S. Singh 90+5'	AFC

Jawaharlal Nehru Stadium, New Delhi, India
Attendance: 30,000
Referee: Sukhbir Singh (Singapore)

== 2012 ==
23 February
15:00 IST
International Friendly

Oman	5–1	India
A. Mohammed 5'; Ajmi 7', 58'; Rabia 87'; A. Thuwaini 90'	Report	Abranches 64'

Sultan Qaboos Sports Complex, Muscat, Oman

27 February
19:00 IST
International Friendly

Azerbaijan	3–0	India
Nadirov 3'; Shukurov 43' (pen.); Hajiyev 84'	UEFA

The Sevens Stadium, Dubai, United Arab Emirates
Attendance: 50
Referee: Hamad Ahmad Abdullah Al Shaikh Hashmi (United Arab Emirates)

9 March
16:45 IST
2012 AFC Challenge Cup

India	0–2	Tajikistan
	Report	Khamrakulov 60'; Davronov 66'

Dasarath Rangasala Stadium, Kathmandu, Nepal
Referee: Ali Sabbagh (Lebanon)

11 March
16:45 IST
2012 AFC Challenge Cup

Philippines	2–0	India
Younghusband 10', 73'	Report

Dasarath Rangasala Stadium, Kathmandu, Nepal
Referee: Chaiya Mahapab (Thailand)

13 March
14:45 IST
2012 AFC Challenge Cup

North Korea	4–0	India
Kwang-ik 3'; Kwang-hyok 34'; Nam-chol 59'; Chol-myong 70'	Report

Dasarath Rangasala Stadium, Kathmandu, Nepal
Referee: Chaiya Mahapab (Thailand)

22 August
19:00 IST
2012 Nehru Cup

India	2–1	Syria
Chhetri 45+2'; Pereira 82'	Report	Al Shbli 89'

Jawaharlal Nehru Stadium, New Delhi, India
Referee: Vladislav Tseytlin (Uzbekistan)

25 August
19:00 IST
2012 Nehru Cup

India	3–0	Maldives
Chhetri 45+2' (pen.), 70'; Nabi 54'	Report

Jawaharlal Nehru Stadium, New Delhi, India
Referee: Hamad Hashmi (United Arab Emirates)

28 August
19:30 IST
2012 Nehru Cup

India	0–0	Nepal
	Report

Jawaharlal Nehru Stadium, New Delhi, India
Referee: Vladislav Tseytlin (Uzbekistan)

31 August
19:30 IST
2012 Nehru Cup

India	0–1	Cameroon
	Report	Samuel Bitte 2'

Jawaharlal Nehru Stadium, New Delhi, India
Attendance: 5,000
Referee: Hamad Hashmi (United Arab Emirates)

2 September (Note: The match is recognized as a full international by several databases including RSSSF India, National Football Teams and worldfootball.net, though the Cameroon RSSSF archive marks the fixture uncertain status.. While FIFA database list the match as official 'A'.)
19:00 IST
2012 Nehru Cup

India	2–2 (a.e.t.)	Cameroon
G. Singh 19'; Chhetri 78' (pen.)	FIFA	Nloga 29'; Mpondo 54'
Penalties
R. Singh (penalty scored); Chhetri (penalty scored); Franco (penalty scored); Hossain (penalty scored); Miranda (penalty scored)	5–4	(penalty scored) Tambe; (penalty scored) Baba; (penalty scored) Kingué; (penalty scored) Mpondo; (penalty missed) Nloga

Jawaharlal Nehru Stadium, New Delhi, India
Attendance: 30,000
Referee: Vladislav Tseytlin (Uzbekistan)

16 October
International Friendly

Singapore	2–0	India
Amri 42'; Nawaz 49'	Report

Choa Chu Kang Stadium, Choa Chu Kang, Singapore
Attendance: 3,448

== 2013 ==
6 February
18:30 IST
International Friendly

India	2–4	Palestine
Miranda 17'; Nabi 39'	Report	Nu'man 30', 48', 65'; Saleh 46'

Jawaharlal Nehru Stadium, Kochi, India
Referee: Rowan Arumughan (India)

2 March
16:00 (UTC+06:30)
AFC CC Qualif.

India	2–1	Chinese Taipei
Shaikh 40'; R. Singh 88'	Report	Tai-lin 54'

Thuwunna Stadium, Yangon, Myanmar
Attendance: 1,000
Referee: Fahad Al-Mirdasi (Saudi Arabia)

4 March
16:00 (UTC+06:30)
AFC CC Qualif.

India	4–0	Guam
Chhetri 49', 90+1'; Miranda 68'; Shaikh 80'	Report

Thuwunna Stadium, Yangon, Myanmar
Attendance: 400
Referee: Khurram Shahzad (Pakistan)

6 March
18:45 (UTC+06:30)
AFC CC Qualif.

Myanmar	1–0	India
Oo 75'	Report

Thuwunna Stadium, Yangon, Myanmar
Attendance: 6,000
Referee: Mohammad Abu Loum (Jordan)

14 August
International Friendly

Tajikistan	3–0	India
D. Nuriddin 12'; F. Fatkhullo 18'; Khamrakulov 90+3'	AIFF

20-Letie Nezavisimosti Stadium, Khujand, Tajikistan
Referee: Khurshed Dodaboeb (Tajikistan)

1 September
18:30 NST
SAFF Championship

India	1–0	Pakistan
Ishaq 14' (o.g.)	Report

Dasarath Rangasala Stadium, Kathmandu, Nepal
Referee: Hettikamkanamge Perera (Sri Lanka)

3 September
15:30 NST
SAFF Championship

Bangladesh	1–1	India
Meshu 82'	Report	Chhetri 90+5'

Halchowk Stadium, Kathmandu, Nepal
Referee: Hettikamkanamge Perera (Sri Lanka)

5 September
15:30 NST
SAFF Championship

Nepal	2–1	India
Gurung 70'; Rai 81'	Report	Nabi 90+2'

Dasarath Rangasala Stadium, Kathmandu, Nepal
Referee: Adham Makhadmeh (Jordan)

9 September
18:30 NST
SAFF Championship SF

Maldives	0–1	India
	Report	Mondal 86'

Dasarath Rangasala Stadium, Kathmandu, Nepal
Referee: Adham Makhadmeh (Jordan)

11 September
18:30 NST
SAFF Championship Final

Afghanistan	2–0	India
Azadzoy 9'; Ahmadi 62'	AFC

Dasarath Rangasala Stadium, Kathmandu, Nepal
Referee: Tayeb Shamsuzzaman (Bangladesh)

15 November
18:00 IST
International Friendly

India	1–1	Philippines
Chhetri 41'	AIFF	Younghusband 42'

Kanchenjunga Stadium, Siliguri, India
Attendance: 15,000
Referee: Sudhis Pandey (Nepal)

19 November
18:00 IST
International Friendly

India	2–0	Nepal
Chhetri 21'; Miranda 48'	Report

Kanchenjunga Stadium, Siliguri, India
Attendance: 25,000
Referee: C. R. Srikrishna (India)

== 2014 ==
5 March
18:00 IST
International Friendly

India	2–2	Bangladesh
Chhetri 14', 90+2'	Report	Chowdhury 51'; Mondal 64' (o.g.)

Fatorda Stadium, Goa, India
Referee: Tejas Nagvenkar (India)

6 October
08:00 IST
International Friendly

India	2–3	Palestine
Chhetri 37'; Fernandes 45'	AIFF	Abu Warda 9'; Yousef 55', 72'

Kanchenjunga Stadium, Siliguri, India

== 2015 ==
12 March
19:00 IST
World Cup Qualifier

India	2–0	Nepal
Chhetri 53', 71'	FIFA; ESPN

Indira Gandhi Athletic Stadium, Guwahati, India
Attendance: 11,200
Referee: Aziz Asimov (Uzbekistan)

17 March
15:30 NST
World Cup Qualifier

Nepal	0–0	India
	FIFA; ESPN

Dasarath Rangasala Stadium, Kathmandu, Nepal
Attendance: 10,500
Referee: Khamis Al Marri (Qatar)

11 June
19:00 UTC+5:30
World Cup Qualifier

India	1–2	Oman
Chhetri 26'	FIFA; ESPN	Said 1'; Al-Hosni 40' (pen.)

Sree Kanteerava Stadium, Bangalore, India
Attendance: 19,312
Referee: Ko Hyung-jin (South Korea)

16 June
16:15 UTC+10
World Cup Qualifier

Guam	2–1	India
McDonald 38'; Nicklaw 62'	FIFA; ESPN	Chhetri 90+4'

Guam F.A. National Training Center, Harmon, Guam
Attendance: 3,227
Referee: Võ Minh Trí (Vietnam)

31 August
20:00 IST
International Friendly

India	0–0	Nepal
	AIFF

Balewadi Stadium, Pune, India
Referee: Ammar Al Jenaibi (UAE)

8 September
19:00 UTC+5:30
World Cup Qualifier

India	0–3	Iran
	AIFF; ESPN	Azmoun 28'; Teymourian 46'; Taremi 49'

Sree Kanteerava Stadium, Bangalore, India
Attendance: 14,500
Referee: Ammar Al-Jeneibi (United Arab Emirates)

8 October
18:00 UTC+5
World Cup Qualifier

Turkmenistan	2–1	India
Abylov 8'; Amanow 60'	ESPN	Lalpekhlua 28'

Köpetdag Stadium, Ashgabat, Turkmenistan
Attendance: 20,100
Referee: Masoud Tufaylieh (Syria)

13 October
18:30 UTC+4
World Cup Qualifier

Oman	3–0	India
Mubarak 55'; Al-Muqbali 67', 84'	ESPN

Al-Seeb Stadium, Muscat, Oman
Attendance: 11,000
Referee: Fahad Al Marri (Qatar)

12 November
19:00 UTC+5:30
World Cup Qualifier

India	1–0	Guam
Singh 10'	ESPN

Sree Kanteerava Stadium, Bangalore, India
Attendance: 6,277
Referee: Jarred Gillett (Australia)

25 December
18:30 IST
SAFF Championship

India	2–0	Sri Lanka
Singh 51', 73'	SAFF; AFC

Trivandrum International Stadium, Trivandrum, India
Attendance: 6,417
Referee: Hiroyuki Kimura (Japan)

27 December
18:30 IST
SAFF Championship

India	4–1	Nepal
Borges 26'; Chhetri 67'; Chhangte 81', 90'	SAFF; AFC	Magar 3'

Trivandrum International Stadium, Trivandrum, India
Attendance: 31,876
Referee: Jameel Juma Abdulhusain (Bahrain)

31 December
15:30 IST
SAFF Championship

India	3–2	Maldives
Chhetri 25'; Lalpekhlua 34', 66'	AFC; SAFF	Nashid 45+2'; Ali 75'

Trivandrum International Stadium, Trivandrum, India
Attendance: 8,177
Referee: Võ Minh Trí (Vietnam)

== 2016 ==
3 January
18:30 IST
2015 SAFF Championship

India	2–1 (a.e.t.)	Afghanistan
Lalpekhlua 72'; Chhetri 101'	SAFF; AFC	Amiri 70'

Trivandrum International Stadium, Trivandrum, India
Attendance: 40,500
Referee: Hiroyuki Kimura (Japan)

24 March
19:00 UTC+4:30
World Cup Qualifier

Iran	4–0	India
Hajsafi 33' (pen.), 66' (pen.); Azmoun 61'; Jahanbakhsh 78'	FIFA; ESPN

Azadi Stadium, Tehran, Iran
Attendance: 29,160
Referee: Võ Minh Trí (Vietnam)

29 March
18:00 UTC+5:30
World Cup Qualifier

India	1–2	Turkmenistan
Jhingan 26'	ESPN	Amanov 48'; Ataýew 70'

Jawaharlal Nehru Stadium (Kochi), Kochi, India
Attendance: 3,111
Referee: Khamis Al Marri (Qatar)

2 June
18:30 UTC+7
Asian Cup Qualifier

Laos	0–1	India
	ESPN	Lalpekhlua 54'

New Laos National Stadium, Vientiane, Laos
Attendance: 1,200
Referee: Omar Al Yaquobi (Oman)

7 June
19:00 UTC+5:30
Asian Cup Qualifier

India	6–1	Laos
Lalpekhlua 43', 74'; Passi 45+1'; Jhingan 48'; Rafique 83'; Cardozo 87'	ESPN	Sihavong 16'

Indira Gandhi Athletic Stadium, Guwahati, India
Attendance: 2,500
Referee: Jansen Foo (Singapore)

3 September
20:00 IST
International Friendly

India	4–1	Puerto Rico
Das 17'; Chhetri 24'; Lalpekhlua 33'; J. Singh 58'	AIFF; ESPN	E. Sanchez 7' (pen.)

Mumbai Football Arena, Mumbai, India
Attendance: 7,000
Referee: Santhosh Kumar (India)

== 2017 ==
22 March
18:30 UTC+7
International Friendly

Cambodia	2–3	India
Laboravy 36'; Vathanaka 62'	AIFF	Chhetri 35'; Lalpekhlua 49'; Jhingan 52'

Olympic Stadium, Phnom Penh, Cambodia
Attendance: 50,000
Referee: Võ Minh Trí (Vietnam)

28 March
18:00 UTC+6:30
Asian Cup qualifier

Myanmar	0–1	India
	AFC	Chhetri 90+1'

Thuwunna Stadium, Yangon, Myanmar
Attendance: 21,025
Referee: Yu Ming-hsun (Chinese Taipei)

6 June
19:00 UTC+5:30
International Friendly

India	2–0	Nepal
Jhingan 60'; Lalpekhlua 78'	AIFF

Mumbai Football Arena, Mumbai, India
Attendance: 4,000
Referee: Pranjal Banerjee (India)

13 June
20:00 UTC+5:30
Asian Cup qualifier

India	1–0	Kyrgyzstan
Chhetri 69'	AFC

Sree Kanteerava Stadium, Bangalore, India
Attendance: 6,213
Referee: Yudai Yamamoto (Japan)

19 August
20:00 UTC+5:30
Tri-Nation Series

India	2–1	Mauritius
R. Singh 37'; B. Singh 62'	AIFF	Jocelyn 15'

Mumbai Football Arena, Mumbai, India
Referee: Hettikamkanamge Perera (Sri Lanka)

24 August
20:00 UTC+5:30
Tri-Nation Series

India	1–1	Saint Kitts and Nevis
J. Singh 38'	AIFF	Gvaune Amory 71'

Mumbai Football Arena, Mumbai, India
Referee: Hettikamkanamge Perera (Sri Lanka)

5 September
19:30 UTC+8
Asian Cup qualifier

Macau	0–2	India
	AFC	B. Singh 57', 82'

Estádio Campo Desportivo, Taipa, Macau
Attendance: 600
Referee: Ahmed Al-Ali (Jordan)

10 October
19:30 UTC+5:30
Asian Cup qualifier

India	4–1	Macau
Borges 28'; Chhetri 60'; Lam Ka Seng 70' (o.g.); Lalpekhlua 90+2'	AFC	Torrão 37'

Sree Kanteerava Stadium, Bangalore, India
Attendance: 4,113
Referee: Yaqoob Abdul Baki (Oman)

14 November
20:00 UTC+5:30
Asian Cup qualifier

India	2–2	Myanmar
Chhetri 13' (pen.); Lalpekhlua 69'	AFC; AIFF	Yan Naing Oo 1'; Kyaw Ko Ko 19'

Fatorda Stadium, Margao, India
Attendance: 5,546
Referee: Liu Kwok Man (Hong Kong)

== 2018 ==
27 March
20:00 UTC+6
Asian Cup qualifier

Kyrgyzstan	2–1	India
Zemlianukhin 2'; Murzaev 72'	AFC; ESPN	Lalpekhlua 88'

Dolen Omurzakov Stadium, Bishkek, Kyrgyzstan
Attendance: 9,588
Referee: Ammar Al-Jeneibi (United Arab Emirates)

1 June
20:00 UTC+5:30
Intercontinental Cup

India	5–0	Chinese Taipei
Chhetri 14', 34', 62'; U. Singh 48'; Halder 78'	AIFF; ESPN

Mumbai Football Arena, Mumbai, India
Attendance: 2,569
Referee: Nivon Robesh Gamini (Sri Lanka)

4 June
20:00 UTC+5:30
Intercontinental Cup

India	3–0	Kenya
Chhetri 68' (pen.), 90+2'; Lalpekhlua 71'	AIFF; ESPN

Mumbai Football Arena, Mumbai, India
Attendance: 8,890
Referee: Hettikamkanamge Perera (Sri Lanka)

7 June
20:00 UTC+5:30
Intercontinental Cup

India	1–2	New Zealand
Chhetri 47'	AIFF; ESPN	De Jong 49'; Dyer 86'

Mumbai Football Arena, Mumbai, India
Referee: Hettikamkanamge Perera (Sri Lanka)

10 June
20:00 UTC+5:30
Intercontinental Cup
Final

India	2–0	Kenya
Chhetri 8', 29'	ESPN

Mumbai Football Arena, Mumbai, India
Referee: Nivon Robesh Gamini (Sri Lanka)

5 September
18:30 IST
SAFF G.S.

India	2–0	Sri Lanka
Kuruniyan 36'; Chhangte 47'	ESPN

Bangabandhu National Stadium, Dhaka, Bangladesh
Referee: Hanna Hattab (Syria)

9 September
18:30 IST
SAFF G.S.

India	2–0	Maldives
Poojari 36'; M. Singh 44'	ESPN

Bangabandhu National Stadium, Dhaka, Bangladesh
Referee: Hanna Hattab (Syria)

12 September
19:00 IST
SAFF S.F.

India	3–1	Pakistan
M. Singh 48', 69'; Passi 84'	Report	H. Bashir 88'

Bangabandhu National Stadium, Dhaka, Bangladesh
Referee: Sivakorn Pu-udom (Thailand)

15 September
18:30 IST
SAFF F

Maldives	2–1	India
Mahudhee 19'; Fasir 66'	ESPN	Passi 90+2'

Bangabandhu National Stadium, Dhaka, Bangladesh
Referee: Hasan Akrami (Iran)

13 October
16:05 IST
Friendly

China	0–0	India
	ESPN

Suzhou Sports Center, Suzhou, China
Attendance: 23,500
Referee: Ravshan Irmatov (Uzbekistan)

17 November
22:30 IST
Friendly

Jordan	2–1	India
Shafi 25'; Haddad 58'	ESPN	N. Kumar 61'

King Abdullah II Stadium, Amman, Jordan
Referee: Wathik Mohammed Al Baag (Iraq)

27 December
19:30 IST
Friendly

Oman	0–0	India
	ESPN

Baniyas Stadium, Abu Dhabi, United Arab Emirates
Referee: Omar Mohammed Al Ali (United Arab Emirates)

== 2019 ==
6 January
19:00 IST
Asian Cup G.S.

Thailand	1–4	India
Dangda 33'	AIFF	Chhetri 27' (pen.), 46'; Thapa 68'; Lalpekhlua 80'

Al Nahyan Stadium, Abu Dhabi, United Arab Emirates
Attendance: 3,250
Referee: Liu Kwok Man (Hong Kong)

10 January
21:30 IST
Asian Cup G.S.

India	0–2	United Arab Emirates
	AIFF	Khalf. Mubarak 41'; Mabkhout 88'

Zayed Sports City Stadium, Abu Dhabi, United Arab Emirates
Attendance: 43,206
Referee: César Arturo Ramos (Mexico)

14 January
21:30 IST
Asian Cup G.S.

India	0–1	Bahrain
	Report	Rashid 90+1' (pen.)

Sharjah Stadium, Abu Dhabi, United Arab Emirates
Attendance: 11,417
Referee: Ilgiz Tantashev (Uzbekistan)

5 June 2019
14:00 IST
King's Cup

Curaçao	3–1	India
Bonevacia 15'; Hooi 17'; Bacuna 33'	AIFF	Chhetri 31' (pen.)

Chang Arena, Buriram, Thailand
Attendance: 8,535
Referee: Chaireag Ngamsom (Thailand)

8 June 2019
14:00 IST
King's Cup

India	1–0	Thailand
Thapa 17'	AIFF

Chang Arena, Buriram, Thailand
Attendance: 11,836
Referee: Jumpei Iida (Japan)

7 July 2019
20:00 IST
Intercontinental Cup

India	2–4	Tajikistan
Chhetri 4' (pen.), 41'	AIFF; FFT	Tursunov 56'; Boboev 58'; Rahimov 71'; Samiev 75'

TransStadia Arena, Ahmedabad, India
Attendance: 7,293
Referee: Jasur Mukhtarov (Uzbekistan)

13 July 2019
20:00 IST
Intercontinental Cup

India	2–5	North Korea
Chhangte 51'; Chhetri 71'	AIFF	Jong Il-gwan 8', 28'; Sim Hyon-jin 16'; Ri Un-chol 63'; Ri Hyong-jin 90+2'

TransStadia Arena, Ahmedabad, India
Attendance: 9,590
Referee: Akhrol Riskullaev (Uzbekistan)

16 July 2019
20:00 IST
Intercontinental Cup

India	1–1	Syria
Gahlot 52'	AIFF	Al-Khatib 78' (pen.)

TransStadia Arena, Ahmedabad, India
Attendance: 5,765
Referee: Jasur Mukhtarov (Uzbekistan)

5 September 2019
19:30 IST
2022 AFC WC Q

India	1–2	Oman
Chhetri 24'	FIFA; AIFF	Rabia Al-Alawi 82', 90'

Indira Gandhi Athletic Stadium, Guwahati, India
Attendance: 22,798
Referee: Mooud Bonyadifar (Iran)

10 September 2019
22:00 IST
2022 AFC WC Q

Qatar	0–0	India
	FIFA

Jassim bin Hamad Stadium, Doha, Qatar
Attendance: 12,020
Referee: Nazmi Nasaruddin (Malaysia)

15 October 2019
19:30 IST
2022 AFC WC Q

India	1–1	Bangladesh
Khan 88'	FIFA; AIFF	Saad 42'

Salt Lake Stadium, Kolkata, India
Attendance: 53,286
Referee: Masoud Tufayelieh (Syria)

14 November 2019
19:30 IST
2022 AFC WC Q

Afghanistan	1–1	India
Nazary 45+1'	FIFA	Doungel 90+3'

Central Republican Stadium, Dushanbe, Tajikistan
Attendance: 8,100
Referee: Yu Ming-hsun (Chinese Taipei)

19 November 2019
20:30 IST
2022 AFC WC Q

Oman	1–0	India
Al-Ghassani 33'	FIFA

Sultan Qaboos Sports Complex, Muscat, Oman
Attendance: 24,250
Referee: Nivon Robesh Gamini (Sri Lanka)

== Opponents ==
India national football team head-to-head records (2010–2019)
Team	Pld	W	D	L	GF	GA	GD	Pts	Confederation
Afghanistan	5	2	2	1	8	5	+3	8	AFC
Australia	1	0	0	1	0	4	–4	0	AFC
Azerbaijan	1	0	0	1	0	3	–3	0	UEFA
Bahrain	2	0	0	2	2	6	–4	0	AFC
Bangladesh	3	0	3	0	4	4	0	3	AFC
Bhutan	1	1	0	0	5	0	+5	3	AFC
Cambodia	1	1	0	0	3	2	+1	3	AFC
Cameroon	2	0	1	1	2	3	–1	1	CAF
China	1	0	1	0	0	0	0	1	AFC
Chinese Taipei	3	3	0	0	10	1	+9	9	AFC
Curaçao	1	0	0	1	1	3	–2	0	CONCACAF
Guam	3	2	0	1	6	2	+4	6	AFC
Guyana	1	0	0	1	1	2	–1	0	CONCACAF
Hong Kong	1	0	0	1	0	1	–1	0	AFC
Iran	2	0	0	2	0	7	–7	0	AFC
Iraq	1	0	0	1	0	2	–2	0	AFC
Jordan	1	0	0	1	1	2	–1	0	AFC
Kenya	2	2	0	0	5	0	+5	6	CAF
Kuwait	1	0	0	1	1	9	–8	0	AFC
Kyrgyzstan	2	1	0	1	2	2	0	3	AFC
Laos	2	2	0	0	7	1	+6	6	AFC
Macau	2	2	0	0	6	1	+5	6	AFC
Malaysia	2	1	1	0	4	3	+1	4	AFC
Maldives	7	5	1	1	14	6	+8	16	AFC
Mauritius	1	1	0	0	2	1	+1	3	CAF
Myanmar	3	1	1	1	3	3	0	4	AFC
Namibia	1	1	0	0	2	0	+2	3	CAF
Nepal	8	4	3	1	11	3	+8	15	AFC
New Zealand	1	0	0	1	1	2	–1	0	OFC
North Korea	2	0	0	2	2	9	–7	0	AFC
Oman	6	0	1	5	3	13	–10	1	AFC
Pakistan	3	3	0	0	7	2	+5	9	AFC
Palestine	2	0	0	2	4	7	–3	0	AFC
Philippines	2	0	1	1	1	3	–2	1	AFC
Puerto Rico	1	1	0	0	4	1	+3	3	CONCACAF
Qatar	1	0	1	0	0	0	0	1	AFC
Saint Kitts and Nevis	1	0	1	0	1	1	0	1	CONCACAF
Singapore	1	0	0	1	0	2	–2	0	AFC
South Korea	1	0	0	1	1	4	–3	0	AFC
Sri Lanka	3	3	0	0	7	0	+7	9	AFC
Syria	2	1	1	0	3	2	+1	4	AFC
Tajikistan	3	0	0	3	2	9	–7	0	AFC
Thailand	4	2	0	2	6	4	+2	6	AFC
Trinidad and Tobago	1	0	0	1	0	3	–3	0	CONCACAF
Turkmenistan	3	0	1	2	3	5	–2	1	AFC
United Arab Emirates	4	0	1	3	2	12	–10	1	AFC
Vietnam	1	1	0	0	3	1	+2	3	AFC
Yemen	1	0	0	1	3	6	–3	0	AFC
Total	105	40	20	45	153	162	–9	140	

== See also ==
- Indian women's national football team results (2010–2019)
- Unofficial games of India in 2010s
- India national football team results (2000–2009)
- India national football team results (2020–present)
