= 2012 Nehru Cup final =

2012 Nehru Cup Final
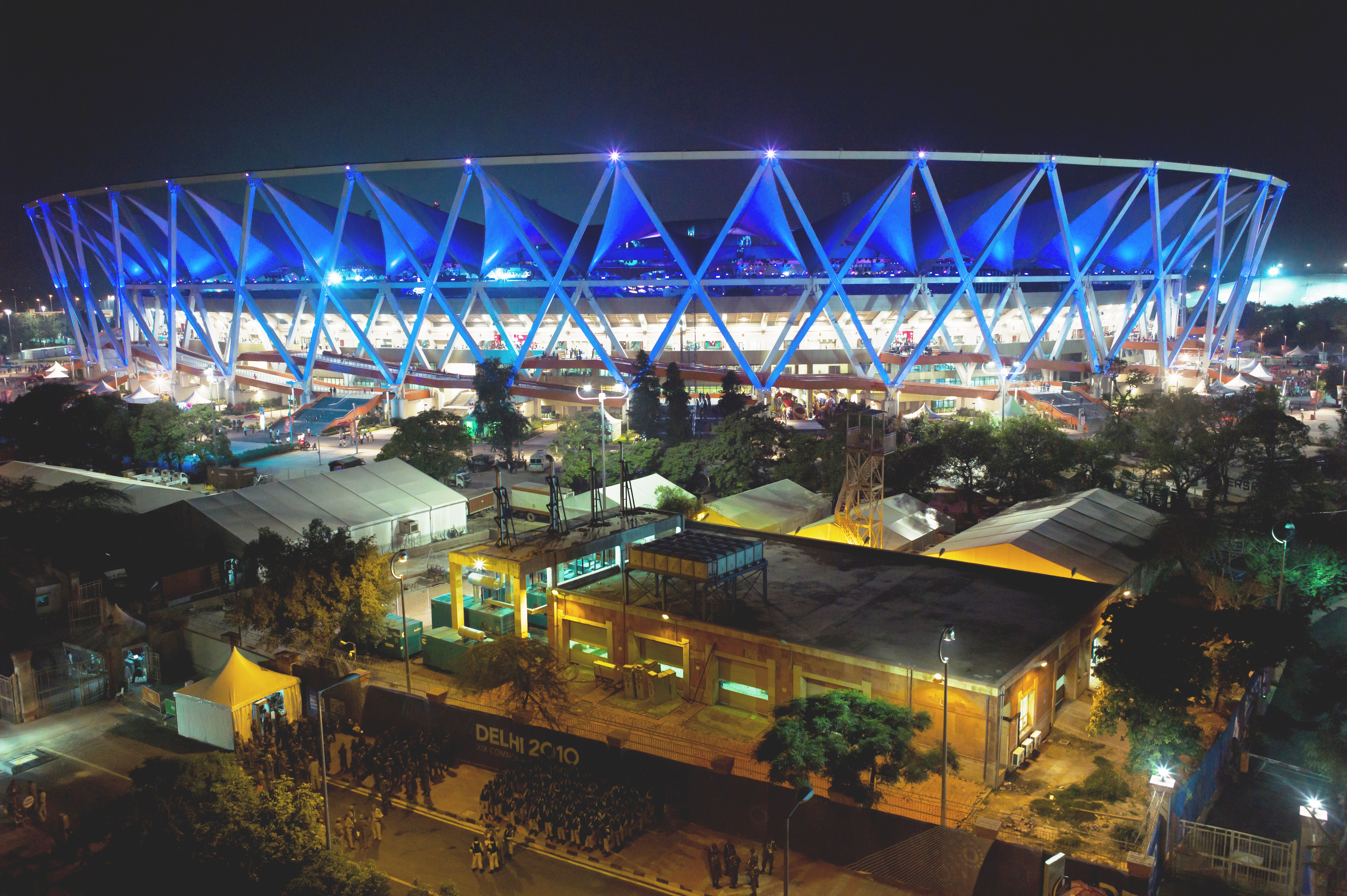
- Event: 2012 Nehru Cup
India	Cameroon
(India)	(Cameroon)
2	2
- After extra time India won 5–4 on penalties
- Date: 2 September 2012
- Venue: Jawaharlal Nehru Stadium, Delhi
- Referee: Vladislav Tseytlin (Uzbekistan)
- Attendance: 30,000

The 2012 Nehru Cup Final was a match that took place on 2 September 2012 at the Jawaharlal Nehru Stadium in Delhi, India between India and Cameroon. India won the match in the penalty shoot out 5–4 after the match ended 2–2 after 120 minutes. India became the winner for the third successive time.

== The teams during the tournament ==
India entered the tournament as reigning champions after winning the 2009 Nehru Cup at the Ambedkar Stadium. However they also came into the tournament following an all defeat performance at the 2012 AFC Challenge Cup but came into the tournament with an added optimism as India got a new head coach in Dutchman Wim Koevermans.

Cameroon on the other hand came in with an all-domestic line-up which meant regular players who play abroad like Alex Song would not play in the tournament. Also current head coach of Cameroon, Denis Lavagne, would not be attending the tournament, leaving assistant coach, Emmanuel Bosso to become temporary head coach for the Nehru Cup.

India opened the tournament with a victory against Syria by beating them 2–1. They followed that victory up with a 3–1 victory over Maldives on 25 August. India then followed that match with a draw against Nepal on 28 August. India finished the group stage campaign with a loss against Cameroon in a match that did not matter as both teams were already through to the Final.

Cameroon opened their Nehru Cup campaign on 24 August playing out a draw against Syria 2–2. Cameroon then went back on track to the final by defeating Nepal 5–0 continuing their good form against Maldives by defeating them 3–1. Cameroon then finished their group stage with a victory over India 1–0.

== Matches ==
=== India ===
22 August 2012	India	2–1	Syria	Delhi
	Chhetri 45+2'; Pereira 82'	Report	Al Shbli 89'	Stadium: Jawaharlal Nehru Stadium

25 August 2012	India	3–0	Maldives	Delhi
	Chhetri 45+2', 70'; Nabi 54'	Report		Stadium: Jawaharlal Nehru Stadium

28 August 2012	India	0–0	Nepal	Delhi
		Report		Stadium: Jawaharlal Nehru Stadium

31 August 2012	India	0–1	Cameroon	Delhi
		Report	Bite 2'	Stadium: Jawaharlal Nehru Stadium

=== Cameroon ===
24 August 2012	Syria	2–2	Cameroon	Delhi
	Al Shbli 42'; Oday Jafal 80'	Report	Mpondo 17'; Alix Ebanga 55'	Stadium: Jawaharlal Nehru Stadium

26 August 2012	Nepal	0–5	Cameroon	Delhi
		Report	Kolony 12', 60'; Ebanga 41', 65'; Momasso 76'	Stadium: Jawaharlal Nehru Stadium

29 August 2012	Cameroon	3–1	Maldives	Delhi
	Mpondo 12', 39'; Ebanga 50' (pen.)	Report	Ghani 26'	Stadium: Jawaharlal Nehru Stadium

31 August 2012	India	0–1	Cameroon	Delhi
		Report	Bite 2'	Stadium: Jawaharlal Nehru Stadium

== Match ==
2 September 2012
19:00

India	2–2 (a.e.t.)	Cameroon
G. Singh 19'; Chhetri 78' (pen.)	FIFA	Nloga 29'; Mpondo 54'
Penalties
R. Singh (penalty scored); Chhetri (penalty scored); Franco (penalty scored); Hossain (penalty scored); Miranda (penalty scored)	5–4	(penalty scored) Tambe; (penalty scored) Baba; (penalty scored) Bebey; (penalty scored) Mpondo; (penalty missed) Thierry Makon Nloga

Nehru Stadium, Delhi
Attendance: 30,000
Referee: Vladislav Tseytlin (Uzbekistan)

India	Cameroon

GK	1	Subrata Pal
RB	4	Nirmal Chettri	(yellow card) 43'	(substituted off) 90+3'
CB	19	Gouramangi Singh
CB	3	Raju Gaikwad
LB	22	Syed Rahim Nabi
RW	8	Sanju Pradhan		(substituted off) 63'
RM	20	Mehtab Hossain
CM	6	Lenny Rodrigues	(yellow card) 49'
LM	15	Clifford Miranda
LW	26	Francis Fernandes
CF	11	Sunil Chhetri (c)
Substitutions:
DF	12	Denzil Franco		(substituted on) 90+3'
FW	23	Robin Singh	(yellow card) 89'	(substituted on) 63'
Manager:
(Netherlands) Wim Koevermans

GK	16	Lawrence Ngome Ngoe		(substituted off) 25'
RB	14	Jean-Patrick Abouna
CB	15	Stéphane Meyoupo
CB	12	Paul Rolland Bebey Kingué (c)		(yellow card) 44'
LB	2	Joseph Julien Momasso
RM	17	Stéphane Kingue Mpondo
CM	13	Thierry Makon Nloga
CM	4	Gustave Moundi Djengue
LM	7	Ashu Tambe
CF	19	Mérimée Kologni		(substituted off) 59'
CF	8	Alix Bertin		(substituted off) 79'
Substitutions:
GK	22	Nkessi Hosea	(yellow card) 77'	(substituted on) 25'
FW	9	Charles Edoa		(substituted on) 59'
FW	11	Ousmaïla Baba		(substituted on) 79'
Manager:
(Cameroon) Emmanuel Bosso
