= List of international goals scored by Sunil Chhetri =

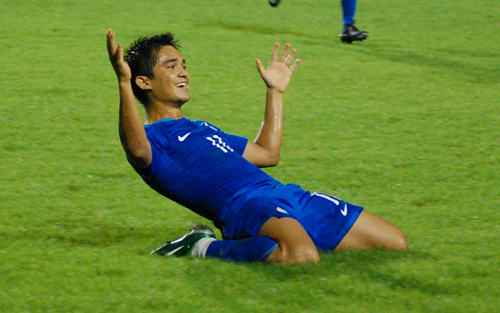
Chhetri scored 95 international goals for India

Sunil Chhetri is a former Indian footballer who represented the Indian national team as a forward. He is the country's all-time top goalscorer and most-capped player. He has scored 95 goals in 157 (Note: RSSSF mistakenly count the match at 2007 AFC Asian Cup qualification between Yemen and India but in-fact he only played in one match in the year 2006. It was in a 0–3 defeat to Japan in the same competition.) official international appearances since his debut on 12 June 2005 against Pakistan. (Note: On 16 May 2024, Chhetri posted a video on his social media handle of X, that the match against Kuwait for the 2026 FIFA World Cup qualification on 6 June 2024 would be his last international match of his career. However on 6 March 2025, AIFF officially mentioned Chhetri in the 26 member squad for March 2025 FIFA Window. It was revealed that the newly appointed head coach, Manolo Márquez requested Chhetri about making a comeback to strengthen the National Team for the third round of the 2027 AFC Asian Cup qualification, which he had agreed upon.) (Note: Chhetri also previously appeared thrice for the India U-20 side and scored 2 goals at the 2004 South Asian Games. He also scored 2 goals in 4 matches at the 2022 Asian Games. These matches are not considered as FIFA 'A' international goals but are considered official goals by AIFF. He also scored a goal in an unofficial friendly match against Qatar. FIFA allows a maximum of six substitutions by each team for friendly matches, but in the match against Qatar, more than six substitutions were made by India, thus the match is not considered an official match.)

On 9 December 2011, Chhetri netted twice in a match (also known as a brace) in India's 3–1 semi-final win over Maldives in the 2011 SAFF Championship to take his tally to 31, thus becoming his country's all-time leading goalscorer surpassing the 29 set by I. M. Vijayan.. With his 95 international goals, he is the fourth-highest international goalscorer behind Cristiano Ronaldo of Portugal, Lionel Messi of Argentina and Ali Daei of Iran. He is also the second highest goalscorer from Asia. On 21 June 2023, Chhetri scored a hat-trick for India in a 4–0 win over Pakistan to take his tally to 90 international goals, thus becoming the second-highest international goalscorer from Asia of all time.

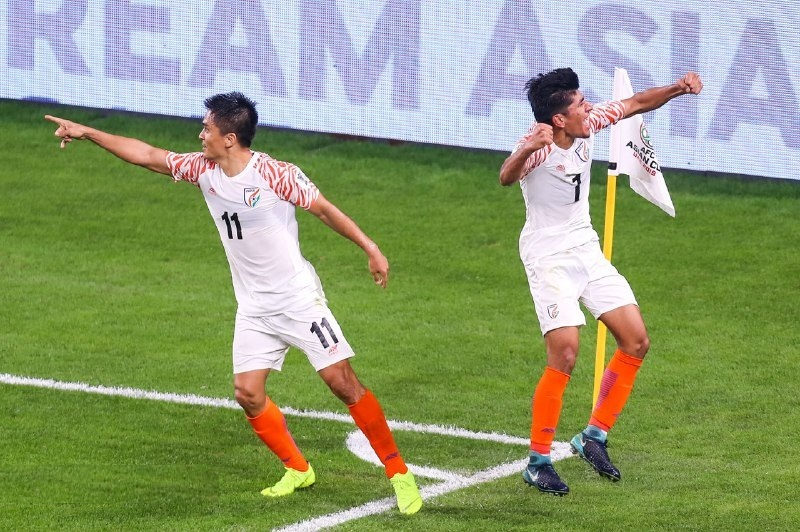
Chhetri (left) celebrating a goal with his teammate Anirudh Thapa in a 2019 AFC Asian Cup group match against Thailand

Chhetri scored his first ever international goal during his first ever international appearance on 12 June 2005 against Pakistan. Chhetri's first international tournament for India was the 2007 Nehru Cup where he scored four goals in total: two against Cambodia, one against Syria, and one against Kyrgyzstan, which helped India to win their first Nehru Cup title. Chhetri's 50th goal came during his 88th match in a 3–2 victory against the Maldives in the 2015 SAFF Championship semi-final on 31 December 2015. He is the only Indian footballer to have scored 50 or more international goals. Between all of his 95 goals: 23 came in SAFF Championship matches, 19 came in friendlies, 13 came in Intercontinental Cup, 10 in FIFA World Cup qualifiers, 9 in the Nehru Cup, 8 in AFC Asian Cup qualifiers, 4 in AFC Asian Cup finals, 1 each in the King's Cup and the Merdeka Tournament, and the rest have come in the AFC Challenge Cup finals and its qualifiers. Chhetri has scored four international hat-tricks, the most by any Indian and has scored braces on sixteen occasions. He has scored nine times against Nepal and the Maldives, the most against a team. He has also scored eleven international goals at Jawaharlal Nehru Stadium in New Delhi, his most at a single ground. He has scored 16 out of his 95 goals from penalty kicks.

== International goals ==
As of 14 October 2025
Score and results list India's goal tally first, score column indicates score after Chhetri's goal.

Key
‡	Indicates goal was scored from a penalty kick

Goal	Cap	Date	Venue	Opponent	Score	Result	Competition	Ref.
1.	1	12 June 2005	Ayub National Stadium, Quetta	Pakistan	1–0	1–1	Friendly	
2.	7	17 August 2007	Ambedkar Stadium, New Delhi	Cambodia	4–0	6–0	2007 Nehru Cup (Friendly tournament)	
3.	7	17 August 2007	Ambedkar Stadium, New Delhi	Cambodia	5–0	6–0	2007 Nehru Cup (Friendly tournament)	
4.	9	23 August 2007	Ambedkar Stadium, New Delhi	Syria	1–0	2–3	2007 Nehru Cup (Friendly tournament)	
5.	10	26 August 2007	Ambedkar Stadium, New Delhi	Kyrgyzstan	2–0	3–0	2007 Nehru Cup (Friendly tournament)	
6.	12	8 October 2007	Saida Municipal Stadium, Sidon	Lebanon	1–0	1–4	2010 FIFA World Cup qualification	
7.	13	30 October 2007	Jawaharlal Nehru Stadium, Margao	Lebanon	1–0	2–2	2010 FIFA World Cup qualification	
8.	14	24 May 2008	Jawaharlal Nehru Stadium, Margao	Chinese Taipei	2–0	3–0	Friendly	
9.	15	24 May 2008	Jawaharlal Nehru Stadium, Margao	Chinese Taipei	3–0	3–0	Friendly	
10.	16	3 June 2008	National Football Stadium, Malé	Nepal	3–0	4–0	2008 SAFF Championship	
11.	18	11 June 2008	National Football Stadium, Malé	Bhutan	1–1	2–1	2008 SAFF Championship	
12.	24	7 August 2008	G. M. C. Balayogi Athletic Stadium, Hyderabad	Myanmar	1–0	1–0	2008 AFC Challenge Cup	
13.	25	13 August 2008	Ambedkar Stadium, New Delhi	Tajikistan	1–0	4–1	2008 AFC Challenge Cup	
14.	25	13 August 2008	Ambedkar Stadium, New Delhi	Tajikistan	3–0	4–1	2008 AFC Challenge Cup	
15.	25	13 August 2008	Ambedkar Stadium, New Delhi	Tajikistan	4–1	4–1	2008 AFC Challenge Cup	
16.	28	23 August 2009	Ambedkar Stadium, New Delhi	Kyrgyzstan	2–0 ‡	2–1	2009 Nehru Cup (Friendly tournament)	
17.	36	8 October 2010	Shree Shiv Chhatrapati Sports Complex, Pune	Vietnam	1–0	3–1	Friendly	
18.	36	8 October 2010	Shree Shiv Chhatrapati Sports Complex, Pune	Vietnam	2–0	3–1	Friendly	
19.	36	8 October 2010	Shree Shiv Chhatrapati Sports Complex, Pune	Vietnam	3–1	3–1	Friendly	
20.	39	14 January 2011	Jassim bin Hamad Stadium, Doha	Bahrain	2–4	2–5	2011 AFC Asian Cup	
21.	40	18 January 2011	Thani bin Jassim Stadium, Doha	South Korea	1–2 ‡	1–4	2011 AFC Asian Cup	
22.	41	21 March 2011	Petaling Jaya Stadium, Petaling Jaya	Chinese Taipei	2–0	3–0	2012 AFC Challenge Cup qualification	
23.	44	10 July 2011	National Football Stadium, Malé	Maldives	1–0	1–1	Friendly	
24.	50	16 November 2011	Salt Lake Stadium, Kolkata	Malaysia	1–0	3–2	Friendly	
25.	50	16 November 2011	Salt Lake Stadium, Kolkata	Malaysia	3–1	3–2	Friendly	
26.	51	3 December 2011	Jawaharlal Nehru Stadium, New Delhi	Afghanistan	1–1	1–1	2011 SAFF Championship	
27.	52	5 December 2011	Jawaharlal Nehru Stadium, New Delhi	Bhutan	4–0	5–0	2011 SAFF Championship	
28.	52	5 December 2011	Jawaharlal Nehru Stadium, New Delhi	Bhutan	5–0	5–0	2011 SAFF Championship	
29.	53	7 December 2011	Jawaharlal Nehru Stadium, New Delhi	Sri Lanka	2–0	3–0	2011 SAFF Championship	
30.	54	9 December 2011	Jawaharlal Nehru Stadium, New Delhi	Maldives	2–1 ‡	3–1	2011 SAFF Championship	
31.	54	9 December 2011	Jawaharlal Nehru Stadium, New Delhi	Maldives	3–1	3–1	2011 SAFF Championship	
32.	55	11 December 2011	Jawaharlal Nehru Stadium, New Delhi	Afghanistan	1–0 ‡	4–0	2011 SAFF Championship	
33.	59	22 August 2012	Jawaharlal Nehru Stadium, New Delhi	Syria	1–0	2–1	2012 Nehru Cup (Friendly tournament)	
34.	60	25 August 2012	Jawaharlal Nehru Stadium, New Delhi	Maldives	1–0 ‡	3–0	2012 Nehru Cup (Friendly tournament)	
35.	60	25 August 2012	Jawaharlal Nehru Stadium, New Delhi	Maldives	3–0	3–0	2012 Nehru Cup (Friendly tournament)	
36.	62	2 September 2012	Jawaharlal Nehru Stadium, New Delhi	Cameroon	2–2 ‡	2–2	2012 Nehru Cup (Friendly tournament)	
37.	66	4 March 2013	Thuwunna Stadium, Yangon	Guam	1–0	4–0	2014 AFC Challenge Cup qualification	
38.	66	4 March 2013	Thuwunna Stadium, Yangon	Guam	4–0	4–0	2014 AFC Challenge Cup qualification	
39.	70	3 September 2013	Halchowk Stadium, Kathmandu	Bangladesh	1–1	1–1	2013 SAFF Championship	
40.	73	15 November 2013	Kanchenjunga Stadium, Siliguri	Philippines	1–0	1–1	Friendly	
41.	74	19 November 2013	Kanchenjunga Stadium, Siliguri	Nepal	1–0	2–0	Friendly	
42.	75	5 March 2014	Jawaharlal Nehru Stadium, Margao	Bangladesh	1–0	2–2	Friendly	
43.	75	5 March 2014	Jawaharlal Nehru Stadium, Margao	Bangladesh	2–2	2–2	Friendly	
44.	76	6 October 2014	Kanchenjunga Stadium, Siliguri	Palestine	1–1	2–3	Friendly	
45.	77	12 March 2015	Indira Gandhi Athletic Stadium, Guwahati	Nepal	1–0	2–0	2018 FIFA World Cup qualification	
46.	77	12 March 2015	Indira Gandhi Athletic Stadium, Guwahati	Nepal	2–0	2–0	2018 FIFA World Cup qualification	
47.	79	11 June 2015	Sree Kanteerava Stadium, Bengaluru	Oman	1–1	1–2	2018 FIFA World Cup qualification	
48.	80	16 June 2015	GFA National Training Center, Dededo	Guam	1–2	1–2	2018 FIFA World Cup qualification	
49.	87	27 December 2015	Greenfield International Stadium, Thiruvananthapuram	Nepal	2–1	4–1	2015 SAFF Championship	
50.	88	31 December 2015	Greenfield International Stadium, Thiruvananthapuram	Maldives	1–0	3–2	2015 SAFF Championship	
51.	89	3 January 2016	Greenfield International Stadium, Thiruvananthapuram	Afghanistan	2–1	2–1	2015 SAFF Championship	
52.	92	3 September 2016	Mumbai Football Arena, Mumbai	Puerto Rico	2–1	4–1	Friendly	
53.	93	22 March 2017	Olympic Stadium, Phnom Penh	Cambodia	1–0	3–2	Friendly	
54.	94	28 March 2017	Thuwunna Stadium, Yangon	Myanmar	1–0	1–0	2019 AFC Asian Cup qualification	
55.	95	13 June 2017	Sree Kanteerava Stadium, Bengaluru	Kyrgyzstan	1–0	1–0	2019 AFC Asian Cup qualification	
56.	97	11 October 2017	Sree Kanteerava Stadium, Bengaluru	Macau	2–1	4–1	2019 AFC Asian Cup qualification	
57.	98	14 November 2017	Jawaharlal Nehru Stadium, Margao	Myanmar	1–1 ‡	2–2	2019 AFC Asian Cup qualification	
58.	99	1 June 2018	Mumbai Football Arena, Mumbai	Chinese Taipei	1–0	5–0	2018 Intercontinental Cup (Friendly tournament)	
59.	99	1 June 2018	Mumbai Football Arena, Mumbai	Chinese Taipei	2–0	5–0	2018 Intercontinental Cup (Friendly tournament)	
60.	99	1 June 2018	Mumbai Football Arena, Mumbai	Chinese Taipei	4–0	5–0	2018 Intercontinental Cup (Friendly tournament)	
61.	100	4 June 2018	Mumbai Football Arena, Mumbai	Kenya	1–0 ‡	3–0	2018 Intercontinental Cup (Friendly tournament)	
62.	100	4 June 2018	Mumbai Football Arena, Mumbai	Kenya	3–0	3–0	2018 Intercontinental Cup (Friendly tournament)	
63.	101	7 June 2018	Mumbai Football Arena, Mumbai	New Zealand	1–0	1–2	2018 Intercontinental Cup (Friendly tournament)	
64.	102	10 June 2018	Mumbai Football Arena, Mumbai	Kenya	1–0	2–0	2018 Intercontinental Cup (Friendly tournament)	
65.	102	10 June 2018	Mumbai Football Arena, Mumbai	Kenya	2–0	2–0	2018 Intercontinental Cup (Friendly tournament)	
66.	105	6 January 2019	Al Nahyan Stadium, Abu Dhabi	Thailand	1–0 ‡	4–1	2019 AFC Asian Cup	
67.	105	6 January 2019	Al Nahyan Stadium, Abu Dhabi	Thailand	2–1	4–1	2019 AFC Asian Cup	
68.	108	5 June 2019	Buriram Stadium, Buriram	Curaçao	1–2 ‡	1–3	2019 King's Cup (Friendly tournament)	
69.	109	7 July 2019	EKA Arena, Ahmedabad	Tajikistan	1–0 ‡	2–4	2019 Intercontinental Cup (Friendly tournament)	
70.	109	7 July 2019	EKA Arena, Ahmedabad	Tajikistan	2–0	2–4	2019 Intercontinental Cup (Friendly tournament)	
71.	110	13 July 2019	EKA Arena, Ahmedabad	North Korea	2–4	2–5	2019 Intercontinental Cup (Friendly tournament)	
72.	112	5 September 2019	Indira Gandhi Athletic Stadium, Guwahati	Oman	1–0	1–2	2022 FIFA World Cup qualification	
73.	117	7 June 2021	Jassim bin Hamad Stadium, Doha	Bangladesh	1–0	2–0	2022 FIFA World Cup qualification	
74.	117	7 June 2021	Jassim bin Hamad Stadium, Doha	Bangladesh	2–0	2–0	2022 FIFA World Cup qualification	
75.	120	5 September 2021	Dasharath Rangasala, Kathmandu	Nepal	2–0	2–1	Friendly	
76.	121	4 October 2021	National Football Stadium, Malé	Bangladesh	1–0	1–1	2021 SAFF Championship	
77.	123	10 October 2021	National Football Stadium, Malé	Nepal	1–0	1–0	2021 SAFF Championship	
78.	124	13 October 2021	National Football Stadium, Malé	Maldives	2–1	3–1	2021 SAFF Championship	
79.	124	13 October 2021	National Football Stadium, Malé	Maldives	3–1	3–1	2021 SAFF Championship	
80.	125	16 October 2021	National Football Stadium, Malé	Nepal	1–0	3–0	2021 SAFF Championship	
81.	127	8 June 2022	Salt Lake Stadium, Kolkata	Cambodia	1–0 ‡	2–0	2023 AFC Asian Cup qualification	
82.	127	8 June 2022	Salt Lake Stadium, Kolkata	Cambodia	2–0	2–0	2023 AFC Asian Cup qualification	
83.	128	11 June 2022	Salt Lake Stadium, Kolkata	Afghanistan	1–0	2–1	2023 AFC Asian Cup qualification	
84.	129	14 June 2022	Salt Lake Stadium, Kolkata	Hong Kong	2–0	4–0	2023 AFC Asian Cup qualification	
85.	133	28 March 2023	Khuman Lampak Main Stadium, Imphal	Kyrgyzstan	2–0 ‡	2–0	Friendly	
86.	135	12 June 2023	Kalinga Stadium, Bhubaneswar	Vanuatu	1–0	1–0	2023 Intercontinental Cup (Friendly tournament)	
87.	137	18 June 2023	Kalinga Stadium, Bhubaneswar	Lebanon	1–0	2–0	2023 Intercontinental Cup (Friendly tournament)	
88.	138	21 June 2023	Sree Kanteerava Stadium, Bengaluru	Pakistan	1–0	4–0	2023 SAFF Championship	
89.	138	21 June 2023	Sree Kanteerava Stadium, Bengaluru	Pakistan	2–0 ‡	4–0	2023 SAFF Championship	
90.	138	21 June 2023	Sree Kanteerava Stadium, Bengaluru	Pakistan	3–0 ‡	4–0	2023 SAFF Championship	
91.	139	24 June 2023	Sree Kanteerava Stadium, Bengaluru	Nepal	1–0	2–0	2023 SAFF Championship	
92.	140	27 June 2023	Sree Kanteerava Stadium, Bengaluru	Kuwait	1–0	1–1	2023 SAFF Championship	
93.	143	13 October 2023	Bukit Jalil National Stadium, Kuala Lumpur	Malaysia	2–3	2–4	2023 Merdeka Tournament (Friendly tournament)	
94.	150	26 March 2024	Indira Gandhi Athletic Stadium, Guwahati	Afghanistan	1–0 ‡	1–2	2026 FIFA World Cup Qualification	
95.	152	19 March 2025	Jawaharlal Nehru Stadium, Shillong	Maldives	3–0	3–0	Friendly	

== Hat-tricks ==
No.	Date	Venue	Opponent	Goal mins	Result	Competition	Ref.
1.	13 August 2008	Ambedkar Stadium, Delhi	Tajikistan	9', 19', 75'	4–1	2008 AFC Challenge Cup	
2.	8 October 2010	Shree Shiv Chhatrapati Sports Complex, Pune	Vietnam	25', 48', 72'	3–1	Friendly	
3.	1 June 2018	Mumbai Football Arena, Mumbai	Chinese Taipei	14', 34', 62'	5–0	2018 Intercontinental Cup	
4.	21 June 2023	Sree Kanteerava Stadium, Bangalore	Pakistan	10', 16' (pen.), 73' (pen.)	4–0	2023 SAFF Championship	

== Statistics ==
As of 14 October 2025

Appearances and goals by year
Year	Apps	Goals
2005	5	1
2006	1	0
2007	7	6
2008	12	8
2009	6	1
2010	6	3
2011	18	13
2012	8	4
2013	11	5
2014	2	3
2015	12	6
2016	4	2
2017	6	5
2018	6	8
2019	11	7
2020	0	0
2021	10	8
2022	6	4
2023	14	9
2024	6	1
2025	6	1
Total	157	95

Appearances and goals by competition
Competition	Apps	Goals
SAFF Championship	27	23
Intercontinental Cup (Friendly tournament)	11	13
FIFA World Cup qualifiers	24	10
Nehru Cup (Friendly tournament)	14	9
AFC Asian Cup qualifiers	16	8
AFC Asian Cup	8	4
AFC Challenge Cup	8	4
AFC Challenge Cup qualifiers	6	3
King's Cup (Friendly tournament)	1	1
Merdeka Tournament (Friendly tournament)	1	1
Friendlies	41	19
Total	157	95

Appearances and goals by confederation
Confederation	Teams	Apps	Goals
AFC	40	145	86
CAF	3	4	5
CONCACAF	4	4	2
OFC	3	4	2
Total	50	157	95

Appearances and goals by opposition
Opposition	Apps	Goals
Nepal	13	9
Maldives	8	9
Bangladesh	7	6
Chinese Taipei	5	6
Afghanistan	10	5
Tajikistan	5	5
Cambodia	3	5
Pakistan	7	4
Kyrgyzstan	4	4
Kenya	2	4
Lebanon	6	3
Myanmar	5	3
Malaysia	4	3
Guam	3	3
Bhutan	2	3
Vietnam	2	3
Syria	7	2
Oman	5	2
Thailand	4	2
Kuwait	4	1
Sri Lanka	4	1
Hong Kong	3	1
Bahrain	2	1
Macau	2	1
North Korea	2	1
Palestine	2	1
Philippines	2	1
Cameroon	1	1
Curaçao	1	1
New Zealand	1	1
Puerto Rico	1	1
South Korea	1	1
Vanuatu	1	1
Singapore	3	0
Turkmenistan	3	0
United Arab Emirates	3	0
Australia	2	0
Fiji	2	0
Laos	2	0
Qatar	2	0
China	1	0
Guyana	1	0
Iran	1	0
Japan	1	0
Jordan	1	0
Mongolia	1	0
Namibia	1	0
Trinidad and Tobago	1	0
Uzbekistan	1	0
Yemen	1	0
Total	157	95

== See also ==
- List of top international men's football goalscorers by country
- List of men's footballers with 50 or more international goals
- List of men's footballers with 100 or more international caps
- List of India national football team hat-tricks
