= Gustave Moundi Djengue =

Cameroonian footballer

Personal information
- Full name: Gustave Moundi Djengue
- Date of birth: February 16, 1985 (age 41)
- Place of birth: Douala, Cameroon
- Height: 1.80 m (5 ft 11 in)
- Positions: Defender; defensive midfielder

Team information
- Current team: Al-Kahrabaa
- Number: 13

Senior career*
Years	Team	Apps	(Gls)
2005−2009	AS Matelots		
2009−2015	Union Douala		
2015−2022	Al-Kahrabaa		
2022−	Karbala		

International career
2012−2013	Cameroon	3	(0)
- * Club domestic league appearances and goals as of 10 July 2017

Gustave Moundi Djengue (born 16 February 1985) is a Cameroonian professional footballer who plays in Iraqi Premier League for Karbala club as a defensive midfielder.

== Honours ==
- Finalist Nehru Cup 2012 with Cameroon
- Cameroon champion in 2012 with Union Douala
