= 2012 Nehru Cup =

- 2012 Nehru Cup official logo

Tournament details
- Host country: India
- Dates: 22 August – 2 September (11 days)
- Teams: 5 (from 2 confederations)
- Venue: 1 (in 1 host city)

Final positions
- Champions: India (3rd title)
- Runners-up: Cameroon
- Third place: Maldives
- Fourth place: Syria

Tournament statistics
- Matches played: 11
- Goals scored: 32 (2.91 per match)
- Top scorer(s): (India) Sunil Chhetri (Cameroon) Alix Ebanga (Cameroon) Stéphane Kingue Mpondo (4 goals)

The 2012 Nehru Cup was the 15th edition of the Nehru Cup and 3rd Nehru Cup since it was revived in 2007. It was held from 22 August to 2 September. The tournament was hosted in New Delhi, India. A total of 5 teams participated in the tournament through being invited by the All India Football Federation. The final match happened between India and Cameroon and India won the match in penalty shoot out.

This was also the last edition before being replaced by Tri-nation series and Intercontinental Cup India won the Nehru Cup after defeating the Cameroon 5–4 on penalties after the match ended 2–2 in extra-time.

== Format ==
On 15 June 2012 the All India Football Federation announced the format for the 2012 Nehru Cup. The tournament was played in a round-robin style. In the end the top 2 teams India & Cameroon from the 5 teams played in the final, which took place on 2 September.

== Broadcasting ==
NEO Sports, a premium all Sports Channel from the bouquet of NEO Sports Broadcast Pvt. Ltd., has acquired the exclusive broadcast rights of 2012 Nehru Cup in the Indian Sub Continent (India, Pakistan, Sri Lanka, Bangladesh, Nepal, Bhutan and Maldives).

== Venue ==
New Delhi
Jawaharlal Nehru Stadium
Capacity: 60,000
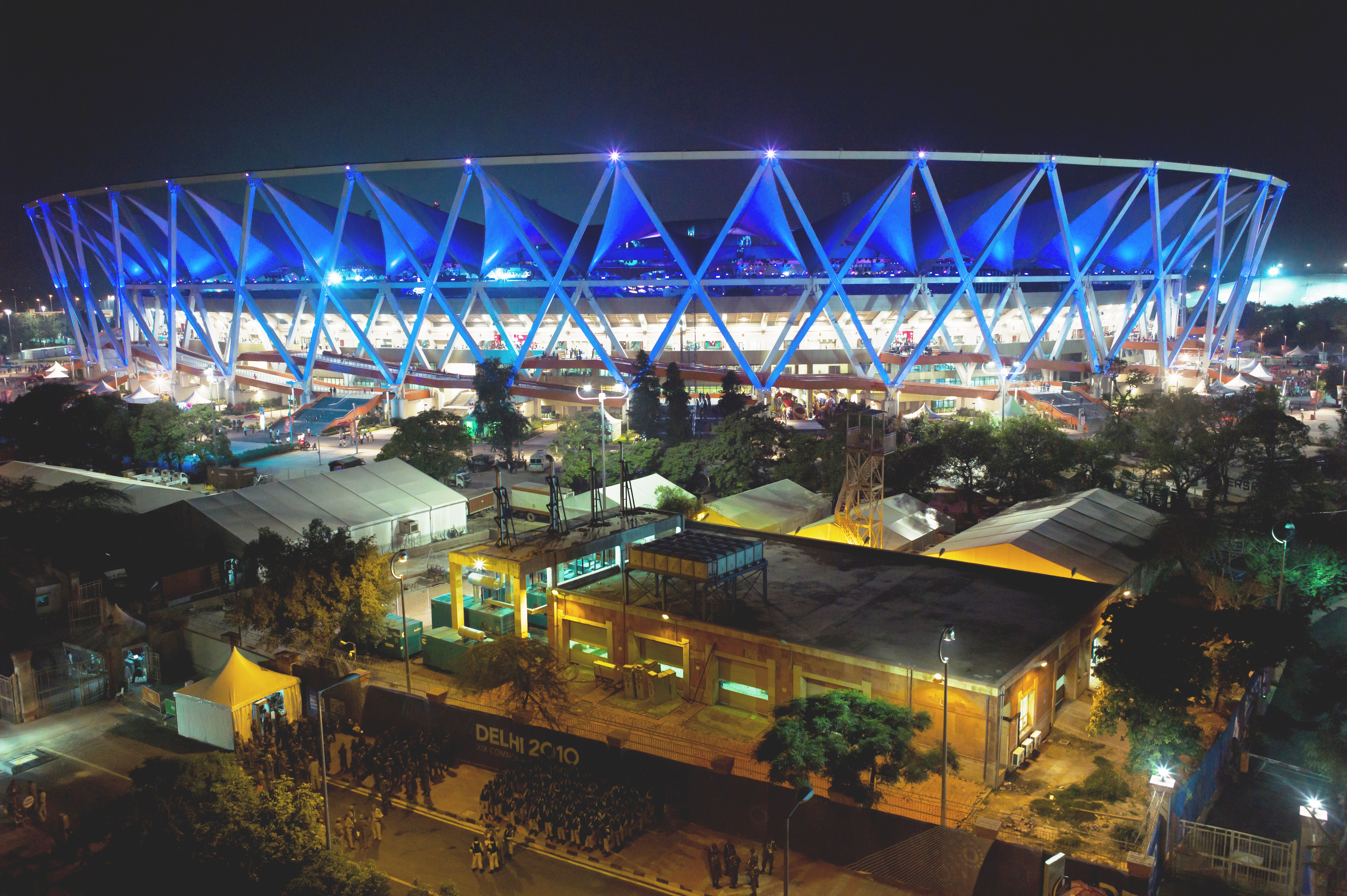

== Teams ==
Teams were:

Country	Confederation	FIFA rank
India	AFC	167
Syria	AFC	147
Maldives	AFC	160
Nepal	AFC	161
Cameroon	CAF	58

== Matches ==
The First Round teams and matches were announced on 6 August 2012 by the All India Football Federation.

Team	Pld	W	D	L	GF	GA	GD	Pts
Cameroon	4	3	1	0	11	3	+8	10
India	4	2	1	1	5	2	+3	7
Maldives	4	2	0	2	5	8	−3	6
Syria	4	1	1	2	6	6	0	4
Nepal	4	0	1	3	1	9	−8	1

Source: GSA
22 August 2012
19:00 IST

India	2–1	Syria
S. Chhetri 45+2'; Pereira 82'	Report	Al Shbli 89'

Nehru Stadium, Delhi
Referee: Vladislav Tseytlin (Uzbekistan)

23 August 2012
19:00 IST

Maldives	2–1	Nepal
Assadhulla 6'; Easa 77'	Report	Rai 90+4'

Nehru Stadium, Delhi
Referee: Santosh Kumar (India)

24 August 2012
19:00 IST

Syria	2–2	Cameroon
Al Shbli 42'; Jafal 80'	Report	Mpondo 17'; Ebanga 55' (pen.)

Nehru Stadium, Delhi
Referee: Rowan Arumughan (India)

25 August 2012
19:00 IST

India	3–0	Maldives
S. Chhetri 45+2' (pen.), 70'; Nabi 54'	Report

Nehru Stadium, Delhi
Referee: Hamad Hashmi (United Arab Emirates)

26 August 2012
19:00 IST

Nepal	0–5	Cameroon
	Report	Kolony 12', 60'; Ebanga 41', 65'; Momasso 76'

Nehru Stadium, Delhi
Referee: Rowan Arumughan (India)

27 August 2012
19:00 IST

Maldives	2–1	Syria
Ashfaq 59'; Rasheed 90+3'	Report	Al Shbli 81'

Nehru Stadium, Delhi
Referee: Santosh Kumar (India)

28 August 2012
19:00 IST

India	0–0	Nepal
	Report

Nehru Stadium, Delhi
Referee: Vladislav Tseytlin (Uzbekistan)

29 August 2012
19:00 IST

Cameroon	3–1	Maldives
Mpondo 12', 39'; Ebanga 50' (pen.)	Report	Akram Abdul Ghani 26'

Nehru Stadium, Delhi
Referee: Hamad Hashmi (United Arab Emirates)

30 August 2012
19:00 IST

Syria	2–0	Nepal
Hani Al Taiar 9'; Ali Ghalioum 49'	Report

Nehru Stadium, Delhi
Referee: Rowan Arumughan (India)

31 August 2012
19:00 IST

India	0–1	Cameroon
	Report	Bitte 2'

Nehru Stadium, Delhi
Referee: Hamad Hashmi (United Arab Emirates)

=== Final ===
2 September 2012
19:00

India	2–2 (a.e.t.)	Cameroon
G. Singh 19'; Chhetri 78' (pen.)	FIFA	Nloga 29'; Mpondo 54'
Penalties
R. Singh (penalty scored); Chhetri (penalty scored); Franco (penalty scored); Hossain (penalty scored); Miranda (penalty scored)	5–4	(penalty scored) Tambe; (penalty scored) Baba; (penalty scored) Bebey; (penalty scored) Mpondo; (penalty missed) Thierry Makon Nloga

Nehru Stadium, Delhi
Attendance: 30,000
Referee: Vladislav Tseytlin (Uzbekistan)

India	Cameroon

GK	1	Subrata Pal
RB	4	Nirmal Chettri	(yellow card) 43'	(substituted off) 90+3'
CB	19	Gouramangi Singh
CB	3	Raju Gaikwad
LB	22	Syed Rahim Nabi
RW	8	Sanju Pradhan		(substituted off) 63'
RM	20	Mehtab Hossain
CM	6	Lenny Rodrigues	(yellow card) 49'
LM	15	Clifford Miranda
LW	26	Francis Fernandes
CF	11	Sunil Chhetri (c)
Substitutions:
DF	12	Denzil Franco		(substituted on) 90+3'
FW	23	Robin Singh	(yellow card) 89'	(substituted on) 63'
Manager:
(Netherlands) Wim Koevermans

GK	16	Lawrence Ngome Ngoe		(substituted off) 25'
RB	14	Jean-Patrick Abouna
CB	15	Stéphane Meyoupo
CB	12	Paul Rolland Bebey Kingué (c)		(yellow card) 44'
LB	2	Joseph Julien Momasso
RM	17	Stéphane Kingue Mpondo
CM	13	Thierry Makon Nloga
CM	4	Gustave Moundi Djengue
LM	7	Ashu Tambe
CF	19	Mérimée Kologni		(substituted off) 59'
CF	8	Alix Bertin		(substituted off) 79'
Substitutions:
GK	22	Nkessi Hosea	(yellow card) 77'	(substituted on) 25'
FW	9	Charles Edoa		(substituted on) 59'
FW	11	Ousmaïla Baba		(substituted on) 79'
Manager:
(Cameroon) Emmanuel Bosso

== Winners ==
2012 Nehru Cup champion

India
Third title

== Statistics ==
=== Goalscorers ===
There were 32 goals scored in 11 matches, for an average of 2.91 goals per match.

4 goals

- (India) Sunil Chhetri
- (Cameroon) Alix Ebanga
- (Cameroon) Stéphane Kingue Mpondo

3 goals

- (Syria) Alaa Al Shbli

2 goals

- (Cameroon) Vigny Kolony

1 goal

- (Cameroon) Joseph Momasso
- (Cameroon) Samuel Bitte
- (Cameroon) Mackon Thierry
- (India) Anthony Pereira
- (India) Syed Rahim Nabi
- (India) Gouramangi Singh
- (Maldives) Akram Abdul Ghani
- (Maldives) Assadhulla Abdulla
- (Maldives) Ali Ashfaq
- (Maldives) Ismail Easa
- (Maldives) Ahmed Rasheed
- (Nepal) Ju Manu Rai
- (Syria) Ali Ghalioum
- (Syria) Hani Al Taiar
- (Syria) Oday Jafal
