= Wim Koevermans =

Dutch footballer (born 1960)

Personal information
- Full name: Wilhelmus Jacobus Koevermans
- Date of birth: 28 June 1960 (age 66)
- Place of birth: Vlaardingen, Netherlands
- Position: Defender

Senior career*
Years	Team	Apps	(Gls)
1978–1980	FC Vlaardingen	48	(6)
1980–1988	Fortuna Sittard	300	(42)
1988–1990	FC Groningen	42	(6)
Total		390	(54)

International career
1988	Netherlands	1	(0)

Managerial career
- 1990–1993: FC Groningen
- 1993–1994: FC Groningen
- 1994–1996: RBC Roosendaal
- 1996–1997: NEC Nijmegen
- 1998–2001: MVV Maastricht
- 2002–2008: Netherlands
- 2008–2012: Ireland
- 2010–2012: Republic of Ireland U21
- 2012–2015: India
Medal record
Representing Netherlands
UEFA European Championship
Winner	1988 West Germany
- * Club domestic league appearances and goals

Wilhelmus ("Wim") Jacobus Koevermans (born 28 June 1960) is a Dutch football coach and former player. A central defender, he earned one cap for the Netherlands national team. Koevermans was a member of the Dutch squad that won the European title at the 1988 European Football Championship in West Germany, although he did not play during the tournament.

== Playing career ==
Koevermans was born in Vlaardingen, South Holland. He played for Fortuna Vlaardingen, FC Vlaardingen, Fortuna Sittard, and FC Groningen. He ended his professional career in 1990.

Koevermans earned his only cap on 24 May 1988, when he started in the friendly game against Bulgaria and was substituted in the 61st minute.

== Coaching career ==
After his retirement from playing Koevermans became a football manager, who worked for clubs like NEC Nijmegen, RBC Roosendaal and MVV Maastricht.

He was the International High Performance Director of the FAI until he was appointed the coach of India. He resumed his office as the Chief Coach of Indian football team on 1 July 2012. He left the post in October 2014 after India's loss against Palestine. He was succeeded by Stephen Constantine.

== Coaching statistics ==
Team	Period	Matches	Won	Drawn	Lost	Win %
India	2012–2015	20	8	4	8	40.0

== Honours ==
=== As manager ===
India

- Nehru Cup: 2012
- SAFF Championship runner-up: 2013
