= Robin Singh (footballer) =

Indian footballer (born 1990)

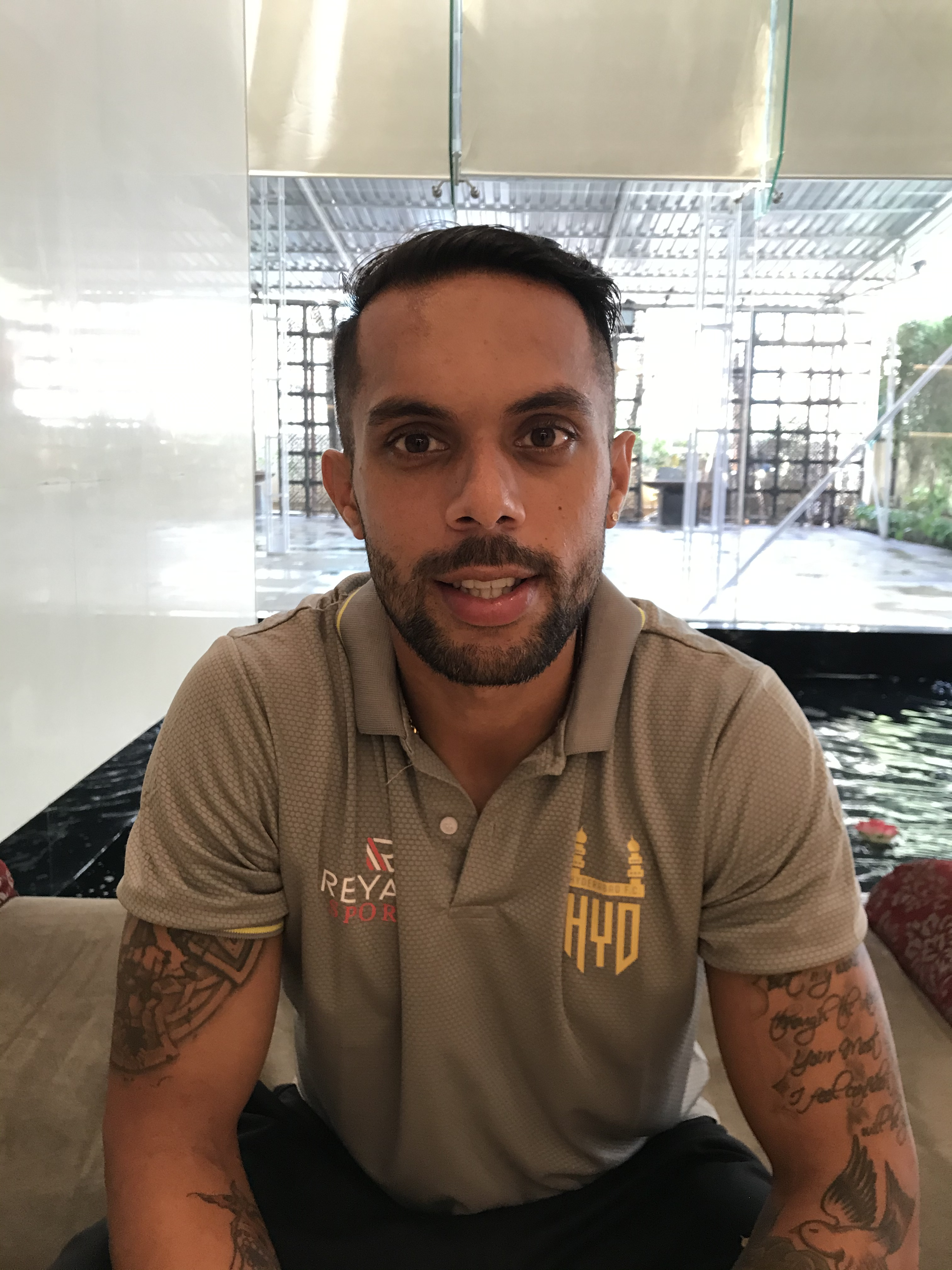
- Singh in December 2019

Personal information
- Date of birth: 9 May 1990 (age 36)
- Place of birth: Noida, Uttar Pradesh, India
- Height: 1.85 m (6 ft 1 in)
- Position: Forward

Youth career
- 2003–2005: Chandigarh Football Academy
- 2005–2009: Tata Football Academy

Senior career*
Years	Team	Apps	(Gls)
2010–2013	East Bengal	42	(14)
2013–2015	Bengaluru	41	(11)
2015–2016	Odisha	13	(4)
2016–2017	Goa	10	(1)
2017	East Bengal	14	(5)
2017–2018	ATK	11	(1)
2018–2019	Pune City	16	(3)
2019–2020	Hyderabad	9	(1)
2020	→ Real Kashmir (loan)	7	(1)
2021–2022	RoundGlass Punjab	11	(2)
2022	SC Bengaluru		

International career
2011–2014	India U23	2	(0)
2012–2017	India	30	(5)
- * Club domestic league appearances and goals

Robin Singh (born 9 May 1990) is an Indian former professional footballer, who played as a forward.

== Club career ==
=== Early career ===
Born in Noida, Uttar Pradesh, Singh started playing cricket and football at an academy in Noida at the age of nine years. He played with them at many youth tournaments. He started playing his football with former Indian footballer, Anadi Barua. At the age of thirteen Singh had to make a choice between either football or cricket and choose football as that was the sport he enjoyed most playing out of the two. Gaining support from his parents Singh started to attend St. Stephen's Football Academy which is located in Chandigarh. A short time later Singh was selected by the UT Sports Department to join the Chandigarh Football Academy. While there Singh played a role in Chandigarh's tournaments like the Junior Challenge Administrator's Cup Football Tournament and the Pre-Subroto Mukerjee Football Tournament. However, Singh was axed by the academy in 2005 after the Subroto Cup for not being in synch with the training program. However, after leaving the Chandigarh Football Academy Singh joined the famed Tata Football Academy in Jamshedpur, Jharkhand in 2005. While at Tata Football Academy Singh was converted into a striker after playing his entire life as a winger in most cases due to his fast pace.

=== East Bengal ===
After spending four years at Tata Football Academy and spending almost a year in both United Arab Emirates (where he trained with a UAE Pro League club) and England (where he was trained by Mel Eves) Singh signed for East Bengal of the I-League after being found by them during a match between East Bengal and Tata FA in which Singh scored a brace against East Bengal at the East Bengal Ground to knock them out of the IFA Shield in what was East Bengal's quickest ever exit from the tournament in their history. He was officially signed from Tata Football Academy for ₹5 million on a 2-year deal in 2009. Singh started his impact early for the club helping them win small cups like the Jubilee Cup. Then on 26 November 2010 Singh scored a brace for East Bengal against arch-rivals Mohun Bagan in the 2010 Calcutta Football League to confirm East Bengal as champions of the West Bengal state league championship that season. Singh scored his first two league and professional goals for East Bengal on 12 December 2010 against Pailan Arrows at the Salt Lake Stadium where he scored in both the 49th and 71st minute to give East Bengal a 4–0 victory. Singh then scored again for East Bengal on 29 December 2010 against Air India FC at the Salt Lake Stadium in which he scored in the 34th minute as East Bengal went on to win 6–1. Singh then scored for East Bengal again on 4 February 2012 against arch-rivals Mohun Bagan yet again but this time in the I-League in the 32nd minute which eventually led to East Bengal drawing the game 1–1. Singh then continued his scoring run by scoring against Mumbai on 30 March 2012 at the Salt Lake Stadium with him scoring in the 25th minute to lead East Bengal to an eventual 3–1 victory. Singh then scored the winner for East Bengal on 16 April 2012 against Chirag United at the Salt Lake Stadium in the 77th minute to give East Bengal a 4–3 victory after being held at 3–3 for most of the match. Singh then scored his last goal of the 2011–12 I-League season on 30 April 2012 against Sporting Goa at the Salt Lake Stadium in which he scored from a penalty in the 82nd minute as East Bengal won 3–0.

During the 2012–13 season, Singh scored three goals. His first goal that season came against 24 November 2012 against ONGC in which he scored the final goal in the 83rd minute for East Bengal as the side won 5–0. He then found the net again on 30 December 2012 against the Pailan Arrows in which he found the net in the 44th minute to lead East Bengal to a 3–0 victory. He then scored his final goal of the season on 5 January 2012 against Salgaocar in which he found the net in the 59th minute to help East Bengal to a 4–1 victory.

=== Bengaluru FC ===
After spending three seasons with East Bengal, Singh signed for new direct-entry I-League side Bengaluru FC on 11 July 2013. He made his debut for the side in the club's very first I-League game ever against Mohun Bagan on 22 September 2013 in which he came on in the 80th minute for Malemngamba Meetei as Bengaluru drew the match 1–1. After being an off-the-bench sub in the first six matches of the season, Singh scored an own goal against his former club, East Bengal, on 26 October 2013 at the Kalyani Stadium in the 49th minute as Bengaluru lost 2–0, their first loss of the season. He however then scored his first actual goal of the season on 21 December 2013 against Salgaocar in which he scored from the penalty spot in the 93rd minute to give Bengaluru FC a 2–1 victory.

Then, in the club's very first Federation Cup match in their history, Singh managed to score a brace off the bench as Bengaluru FC won 5–3 over Sporting Goa. Robin Singh played 5 of Bengaluru FC's 2014-15 Indian Federation Cup campaign, scoring twice in the process, including the winner against Dempo in the final. The CEO of Bengaluru FC, Parth Jindal confirmed that Robin Singh along with Sunil Chhetri and Thoi Singh will become contracted to the Indian Super League at the end of the season, to join the ISL team that drafts them in, but an arrangement has been agreed that they will be loaned back to Bengaluru FC for the next I-League season.

=== FC Goa ===
Robin signed a one-year deal with FC Goa for 2016 Indian Super League season. He scored his first goal for the Goan club in a 2–1 win against Northeast United. He would make 10 appearances and would score only the one goal in the season for his team.

=== East Bengal ===
Robin Singh rejoined former club East Bengal for the 2016-17 I-League. Robin scored 5 goals in 14 appearances in the league as his team finished 3rd in the league and reached semi-finals of the Federation Cup.

=== ATK ===
Singh was signed by ISL champions ATK for the fourth edition of the league. In his six league appearances for the club he was able to score once. In the match against Mumbai City, a cross from the right hand side by Zequinha was flown inside, Singh came in running in to the box only managing to put a touch on the ball which was enough for it to go in.

=== Real Kashmir (loan) ===
On 4 February 2020, it was announced that Robin was signed by I-League club Real Kashmir on loan from Indian Super League club Hyderabad FC.

=== Punjab FC ===
For 2021–22 season, Singh joined I-league side Punjab FC.

=== SC Bengaluru ===
In 2022, Singh joined I-league 3 side Sporting Club Benguluru.

== International career ==
Robin Singh has represented India at the India U16, India U23, and India senior level. He represented the under-16s when he was at Tata Football Academy and even played against clubs like VfL Wolfsburg youth and FC Augsburg youth teams. He made his debut at the under-23 level on 9 March 2011 against Myanmar during the 2012 Olympic qualifiers in which he came on as a 67th-minute substitute for Malsawmfela as India U23's drew 1–1 which was enough on aggregate to send them to the 2nd Round of Asian Olympic qualification.

Robin made his senior debut for India on 25 August 2012 during the 2012 Nehru Cup against Maldives at the Nehru Stadium in the Indian capital of Delhi, coming on as a 46th-minute substitute for his East Bengal teammate Sanju Pradhan; India won the match 3–0. Then on 2 September 2012 Singh helped India win the Nehru Cup by beating Cameroon B in the final 5–4 on penalties with Singh coming on in the 63rd minute for Sanju Pradhan and then scoring the first penalty for India in the penalty shoot-out after the match ended in regulation time 2–2.

Robin then scored his first ever goal for India's seniors on 2 March 2013 against Chinese Taipei during the 2014 AFC Challenge Cup qualifiers when he found the net in the 90th minute to give India a last minute winner, 2–1. He scored his second international goal against Guam in a 2018 FIFA World Cup qualifier on 12 November 2015 which turned out to be the winner. He scored his 3rd and 4th goal against Sri Lanka in the 2015 SAFF Championship. Robin Singh scored his 5th International goal against Mauritius in the Hero Tri-Nation Series Cup on 19 August 2017.

== Career statistics ==
=== Club ===
As of 13 May 2022

Club	Season	League			Federation Cup		Durand Cup		AFC		Total	
Club	Season	Division	Apps	Goals	Apps	Goals	Apps	Goals	Apps	Goals	Apps	Goals
East Bengal	2010–11	I-League	13	6	6	1	—	—	5	1	24	8
East Bengal	2011–12	I-League	16	5	3	2	—	—	6	0	25	7
East Bengal	2012–13	I-League	13	3	0	0	—	—	2	0	15	3
East Bengal	Total		42	14	9	3	0	0	13	1	64	18
Bengaluru	2013–14	I-League	23	5	1	2	—	—	—	—	24	7
Bengaluru	2014–15	I-League	18	6	5	2	3	0	6	1	32	9
Bengaluru	Total		41	11	6	4	3	0	6	1	56	16
Odisha	2015	Indian Super League	12	4	—	—	—	—	—	—	12	4
Odisha	Total		12	4	0	0	0	0	0	0	12	4
Goa	2016	Indian Super League	10	1	—	—	—	—	—	—	10	1
Goa	Total		10	1	0	0	0	0	0	0	10	1
East Bengal (loan)	2016–17	I-League	14	5	3	2	—	—	0	0	17	7
East Bengal (loan)	Total		14	5	3	2	0	0	0	0	17	7
ATK	2017–18	Indian Super League	8	1	—	—	—	—	—	–	8	1
ATK	Total		8	1	0	0	0	0	0	0	8	1
Pune City	2018–19	Indian Super League	16	4	—	—	—	—	—	–	16	4
Pune City	Total		16	4	0	0	0	0	0	0	16	4
Hyderabad	2019–20	Indian Super League	9	1	—	—	—	—	—	–	8	1
Hyderabad	Total		9	1	0	0	0	0	0	0	8	1
Real Kashmir	2019–20	I-League	7	1	—	—	—	—	—	–	7	1
Real Kashmir	Total		7	1	0	0	0	0	0	0	7	1
RoundGlass Punjab	2021–22	I-League	11	2	—	—	—	—	—	–	11	2
Career total			170	44	18	9	3	0	19	2	209	55

=== National team statistics ===
As of 31 December 2019

India national team
Year	Apps	Goals
2012	5	0
2013	8	1
2014	1	0
2015	12	3
2016	0	0
2017	4	1
Total	30	5

=== India national under-23 football team statistics ===
As of 31 December 2019

India national under-23 football team
Year	Apps	Goals
2014	2	0
Total	2	0

=== International goals ===
Score and Result lists India's goals first.

#	Date	Venue	Opponent	Score	Result	Competition
1.	2 March 2013	Thuwunna Stadium, Yangon, Myanmar	Chinese Taipei	2–1	2–1	2014 AFC Challenge Cup qualification
2.	12 November 2015	Sree Kanteerava Stadium, Bangalore, India	Guam	1–0	1–0	2018 FIFA World Cup qualification
3.	25 December 2015	Trivandrum International Stadium, Trivandrum, India	Sri Lanka	1–0	2–0	2015 SAFF Championship
4.	25 December 2015	Trivandrum International Stadium, Trivandrum, India	Sri Lanka	2–0	2–0	2015 SAFF Championship
5.	19 August 2017	Mumbai Football Arena, Mumbai, India	Mauritius	1–1	2–1	2017 Hero Tri-Nation Series

== Honours ==
India

- SAFF Championship: 2015; runner-up: 2013
- Nehru Cup: 2012
- Tri-Nation Series: 2017

== Personal life ==
Robin Singh has many tattoos, totalling five tattoos; a warrior on one shoulder and a Christian cross and prayer on the other. He is Christian. Singh is of paternal Punjabi and maternal Bengali descent. Robin Singh is married to actress, filmmaker, entrepreneur Lianne Texeira.
