= Gouramangi Singh =

Indian footballer (born 1986)

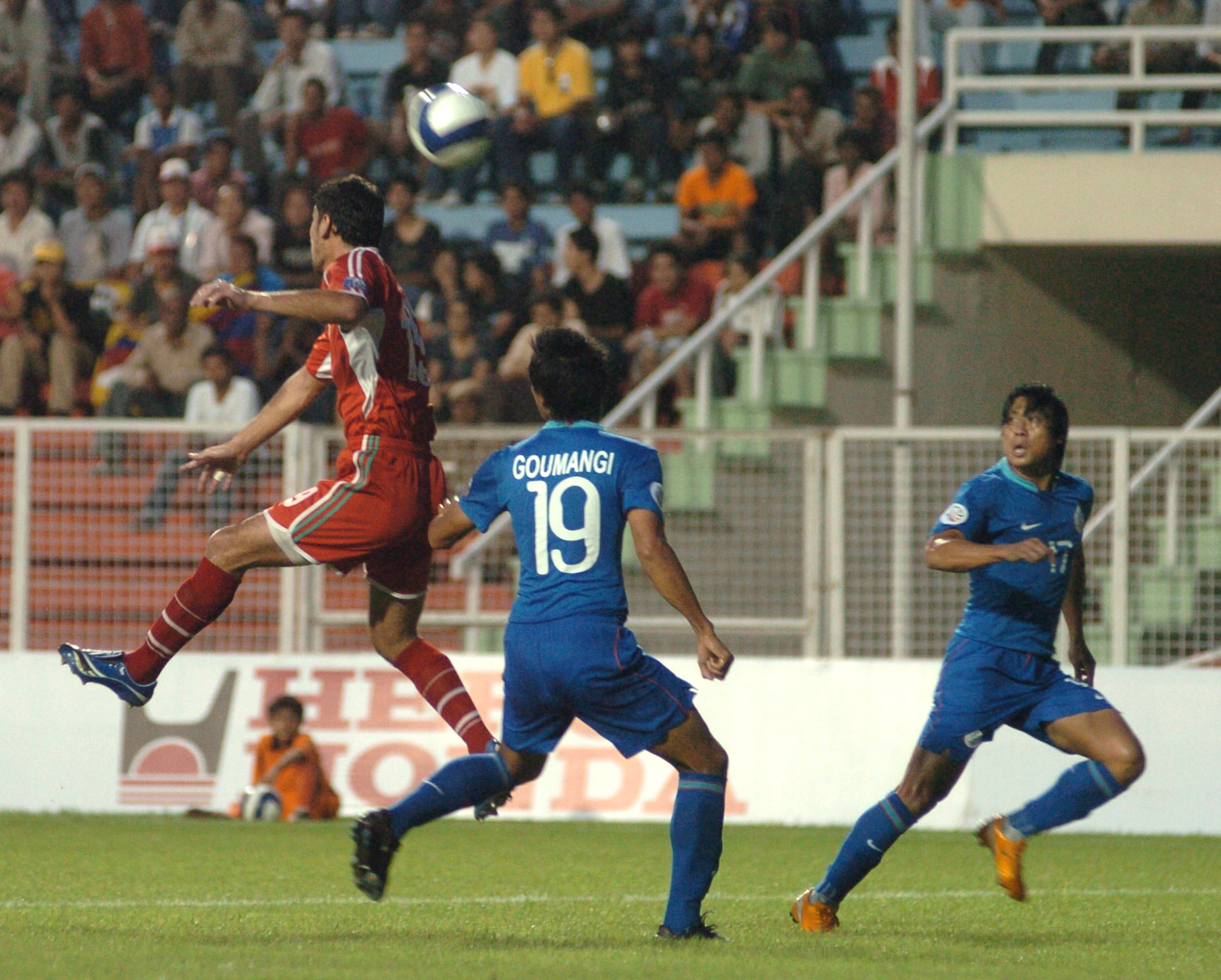
- Singh with India (no 19) in action against Tajikistan in 2008

Personal information
- Full name: Gouramangi Singh Moirangthem
- Date of birth: 25 January 1986 (age 40)
- Place of birth: Imphal, Manipur, India
- Height: 1.86 m (6 ft 1 in)
- Position: Centre-back

Youth career
- –2004: TFA

Senior career*
Years	Team	Apps	(Gls)
2004–2005	Mohun Bagan	26	(2)
2005–2006	Mahindra United	32	(4)
2006–2007	Sporting Goa	26	(4)
2007–2012	Churchill Brothers	158	(24)
2012–2013	Prayag United	28	(2)
2013–2014	Rangdajied United	30	(4)
2014–2015	Chennaiyin	28	(4)
2015–2016	→ Bharat (loan)	28	(4)
2016–2017	Pune City	28	(4)
2017–2018	DSK Shivajians	32	(4)
2018–2019	NEROCA	30	(2)

International career
2004–2006	India U20	26	(2)
2006–2007	India U23	18	(4)
2006–2013	India	72	(6)

Managerial career
- 2019–2022: Bengaluru United (assistant)
- 2022–2026: Goa (assistant)
- 2026: Goa
- * Club domestic league appearances and goals

Gouramangi Singh Moirangthem (Meitei: Moirangthem Gouramangi Singh, born 25 January 1986) is an Indian professional football manager and former player, who was recently the head coach of Indian Super League club Goa.

== Club career ==
A product of the Tata Football Academy, he has plied his trade with many clubs in the country, including Dempo SC and Churchill Brothers. While at Dempo, Singh won the Federation Cup and the National Football League. Gouramangi is one of the tallest players in the India national team and possesses an ability to head the ball strongly especially in set piece situations and is also effective in tackling.

Over the course of his professional career, Singh has won nearly every club trophy in India, including the National Football League (which was replaced by the I-League) and the Federation Cup with Mahindra United in 2005/2006 & the I-League in 2009. Singh was also voted the best defender in the I-League for the 2008/09 season.

In 2010, Gouramangi was called upon by Melbourne Heart for a trial, which despite reportedly impressing Heart staff, was unsuccessful. It was mutually decided that Gouramangi would not get first opportunities in presence of other stars.

=== Churchill Brothers ===
Gouramangi joined Churchill Brothers from Sporting Clube De Goa in the year 2007-08 I league season and remained with the club until 2013. He won 1 league, two IFA Shields and Two Durand Cups during his five years with Churchill brothers.

=== Rangdajied United ===
On 20 November 2013, despite earlier rejecting ISL signed players, Rangdajied United F.C. of the I-League agreed to sign Gouramangi on as well as Subrata Pal, Sandesh Jhingan, Manandeep Singh, and Tomba Singh.

He made his debut in the I-League on 22 November 2013 against Shillong Lajong F.C. at the Jawaharlal Nehru Stadium, Shillong in which he played the whole match as Rangdajied drew the match 1–1.

=== Chennai ===
In the fall of 2014 Gouramangi singh joined Chennaiyin FC in the inaugural season of Indian Super League, joining the likes of Marco Materazzi.

=== Bharat FC ===
Gouramangi Singh signed with newly formed Bharat FC for the 2014–15 I-League He was the captain of the team.

=== FC Pune City ===
On 21 March 2015 FC Pune City announced that they had signed Gouramangi Singh for the 2015 Indian Super League.

=== NEROCA ===
In 2017, he signed with NEROCA.

== International career ==
He played a vital part of the Indian team that won the 2007 Nehru Cup. Gouramangi also played an important part of the victorious India team at the 2008 AFC Challenge Cup. After joining the national team in 2006, he has been a vital player in coach Houghton's side. On 28 July 2011 Singh scored a significant goal for India in the 2014 FIFA World Cup qualifier against the United Arab Emirates but it did not help as India were knocked out 5–2 on aggregate. He scored his 6th and final goal for India in the final of 2012 Nehru Cup against Cameroon.

== International goals ==
Goal	Date	Venue	Opponent	Score	Result	Competition
1	7 June 2008	Rasmee Dhandu Stadium, Malé, Maldives	Maldives	1–0	1–0	2008 SAFF Cup
2	11 June 2008	Rasmee Dhandu Stadium, Malé, Maldives	Bhutan	2–1	2–1	2008 SAFF Cup
3	26 August 2009	Ambedkar Stadium, Delhi, India	Sri Lanka	2–1	3–1	2009 Nehru Cup
4	14 January 2011	Jassim Bin Hamad Stadium, Doha, Qatar	Bahrain	1–1	2–5	2011 AFC Asian Cup
5	28 July 2011	Ambedkar Stadium, New Delhi, India	United Arab Emirates	2–2	2–2	2014 FIFA World Cup Qualifier
6	2 September 2012	Jawaharlal Nehru Stadium, New Delhi, India	Cameroon	1–0	2–2	2012 Nehru Cup

=== International statistics ===
As of 9 April 2015

India national team
Year	Apps	Goals
2007	5	0
2008	13	2
2009	6	1
2010	9	0
2011	16	2
2012	11	1
2013	10	0
Total	71	6

== Coaching career ==
=== Bengaluru United ===
On 26 December 2019, it was announced that Gouramangi joined Bengaluru United as head coach. He managed the club in Bangalore Super Division League. He later became assistant coach of the club.

=== FC Goa ===
On 13 July 2022 he was appointed as a First-team assistant coach of Indian Super league club FC Goa.

== Managerial statistics ==
As of match played 23 May 2026

Managerial record by team and tenure
Team	Nat	From	To	Record					Ref
Team	Nat	From	To	G	W	D	L	Win %	Ref
Goa	(India)	24 July 2026	13 November 2026	8	2	2	4	25.00	
Total				8	2	2	4	25.00	—

== Honours ==
India

- AFC Challenge Cup: 2008
- SAFF Cup: 2011; runner-up: 2008, 2013
- Nehru Cup: 2007, 2009, 2012

India U20

- South Asian Games Silver medal: 2004

India U19

- National Football League U-19 runner-up: 2001

Club

- National League Champions 2004-05 (Dempo SC); 2005–06 (Mahindra United)
- I-League 2008-09 Champions
- Federation Cup Champions 2004-05 (Dempo SC); 2005–06 (Mahindra United)

Individual

- AIFF Player of the Year: 2010
- I-League Best Defender of the 2008–09 season.

== Personal life ==
Gouramangi Singh hails from the small village of Awang Sekmai, a 17 kilometers north of Imphal and comes from a modest background.

=== Salary ===
Gouramangi is notable for being one of India's highest paid footballers and even sportspeople. While at Churchill Brothers Singh made Rs.1 crore playing in the 2012–13 season. Playing for Prayag United Singh earned an impressive Rs. 1.05 crore from his club. During the 2014 Indian Super League Gouramangi, along with Subrata Pal and Syed Rahim Nabi where the most valuable players of the league making Rs. 80 lakhs each.
