= Anthony Pereira =

Indian footballer

Personal information
- Date of birth: 9 April 1982 (age 44)
- Place of birth: Navelim, Goa, India
- Height: 1.69 m (5 ft 6 1/2 in)
- Position: Midfielder

Senior career*
| Years | Team | Apps | (Gls) |
| 2005–2006 | Vasco | | |
| 2006–2013 | Dempo | | |
| 2013 | Churchill Brothers | 8 | (0) |

International career^{‡}
| 2009–2012 | India | 29 | (3) |
- * Club domestic league appearances and goals as of 21 December 2013 ‡ National team caps and goals as of 15 November 2013

Anthony Pereira (born 9 April 1982) is a former Indian professional footballer, who represented the India national football team on 29 occasions between 2009 and 2012.

== Club career ==
Anthony started his football career in Vasco S.C. After 2 seasons, he moved to Dempo S.C. where his football career flourished under the coaching of Armando Colaco. During his 7-year stint at the club, Dempo S.C. won the I-League 4 times.

== International career ==
On 22 August 2012, Pereira scored a goal in 84th minute against Syria coming as a second-half substitute in the Nehru Cup where India won 2–1.

== Statistics ==
=== International ===
Statistics accurate as of 15 November 2013

| National team | Year | Apps | Goals |
|---|---|---|---|
| India | 2009 | 5 | 0 |
| India | 2010 | 9 | 2 |
| India | 2011 | 8 | 0 |
| India | 2012 | 7 | 1 |
| India | Total | 29 | 3 |

=== International goals ===
| # | Date | Venue | Opponent | Score | Result | Competition |
|---|---|---|---|---|---|---|
| 1 | 7 September 2010 | New Delhi | Namibia | 2–0 | Win | Friendly Match |
| 2 | 20 August 2012 | New Delhi | Syria | 2–1 | Win | 2012 Nehru Cup |

== Honours ==
India

- SAFF Championship: 2011
- Nehru Cup: 2009, 2012
