= Denzil Franco =

Indian footballer

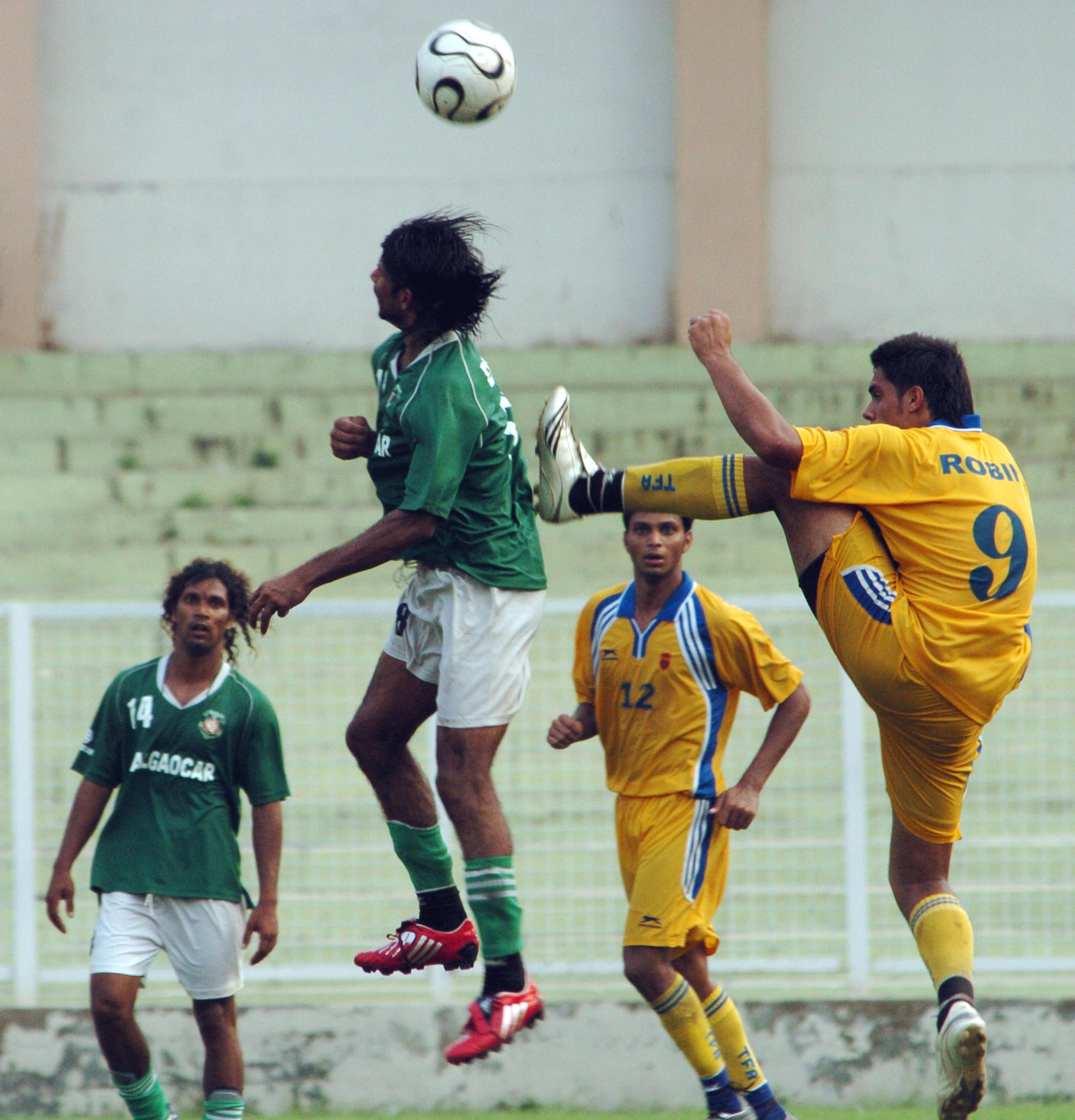
- Franco before commentating

Personal information
- Full name: Denzil Franco
- Date of birth: 30 June 1985 (age 41)
- Place of birth: Saligao, Goa, India
- Height: 1.83 m (6 ft 0 in)
- Position: Defender

Youth career
- 2000–2003: Sesa FA

Senior career*
Years	Team	Apps	(Gls)
2003–2005	Salgaocar		
2005–2008	Sporting Goa		
2008	Salgaocar		
2008–2010	Mahindra United		
2010–2014	Churchill Brothers		
2014–2015	Atlético de Kolkata	10	(0)
2016	Goa	0	(0)
2017	Churchill Brothers	0	(0)
2017	Bardez		

International career^{‡}
2010	India U23		
2010–2014	India	12	(0)
- * Club domestic league appearances and goals as of 11 December 2017 ‡ National team caps and goals as of 11 December 2017

Denzil Franco (born 30 June 1985) is an Indian professional footballer who last played as a defender for Bardez in the Goa Professional League. Also an All India Trinamool Congress politician.

Franco currently works as a colour commentator and analyst, covering Indian football for Star Sports.

== Career ==
=== Early career ===
Born in Saligao, Goa, Franco began his footballing career through his father, Joe Franco, who was a footballer in Mumbai. He soon joined the Sesa Football Academy and stayed there until he signed with Salgaocar of the National Football League. He then joined Sporting Goa in 2005 and stayed with the club until 2008. He rejoined Salgaocar temporarily for the Goa Professional League before signing with I-League side Mahindra United.

=== Churchill Brothers ===
In November 2010, it was confirmed that Franco had signed with Churchill Brothers prior to the start of the 2010–11 season and after Mahindra United disbanded. While with Churchill Brothers, Franco helped the club win the I-League in 2012–13. He then soon after helped them complete the double when Churchill Brothers won the Federation Cup 2013–14.

=== Later career ===
On 22 July 2014, Franco was one of many players available for selection during the 2014 ISL Inaugural Domestic Draft. He was selected by Atlético de Kolkata. He made his debut for the Indian Super League side in the very first ISL match ever when Atlético de Kolkata took on Mumbai City at the Salt Lake Stadium. He started and played the full match as Kolkata won 3–0. On 23 October 2014, in a match against Goa, Franco suffered an anterior cruciate ligament injury and had to be substituted off after 22 minutes. He proceeded to miss the rest of the season.

After making ten appearances for Kolkata over two seasons, Franco moved back to his home state to play for Goa. He appeared on the bench six times but didn't play at all during the season, mainly due to injury. After his time with Goa, Franco returned to Churchill Brothers for the 2016–17 I-League. After the season concluded, Franco signed with Goa Professional League side FC Bardez.

== International career ==
Franco made his international debut for India on 17 February 2010 in the AFC Challenge Cup against Kyrgyzstan. He was part of the India squad which won the 2012 Nehru Cup and even played in the final against Cameroon A.

== International goals ==
No.	Date	Venue	Opponent	Score	Result	Competition
1.	17 February 2010	Sugathadasa Stadium, Colombo, Sri Lanka	Kyrgyzstan	1–2	1–2	2010 AFC Challenge Cup

== Honours ==
Churchill Brothers

- I-League: 2012–13
- Federation Cup: 2013–14
- Durand Cup: 2011

Atlético de Kolkata

- Indian Super League: 2014

India

- Nehru Cup: 2012

India U23

- SAFF Championship: 2009
