= Clifford Miranda =

Indian footballer and coach (born 1982)

Personal information
- Full name: Clifford Rayes Miranda
- Date of birth: 11 July 1982 (age 44)
- Place of birth: Margao, Goa, India
- Height: 5 ft 8 in (1.73 m)
- Position: Attacking midfielder

Team information
- Current team: Chennaiyin (head coach)

Youth career
- 1996–2000: Tata FA

Senior career*
Years	Team	Apps	(Gls)
2000–2015	Dempo	475	(56)
2014	→ Goa (loan)	16	(2)
2015–2016	Atlético de Kolkata	16	(4)
2016	→ Mumbai (loan)	16	(2)
2016	Minerva Punjab	18	(6)
2017–2018	Churchill Brothers	24	(6)
Total		565	(70)

International career
2005–2014	India	45	(6)

Managerial career
- 2018–2019: Goa Reserves
- 2019–2022: Goa (assistant)
- 2020–2022: Goa (interim)
- 2022–2023: Odisha (assistant)
- 2023: Odisha (interim)
- 2023–2024: Mohun Bagan SG (assistant)
- 2023–2024: India U23 (head coach)
- 2024–2025: Mumbai City (assistant)
- 2025–: Chennaiyin
- * Club domestic league appearances and goals

Clifford Rayes Miranda (born 11 July 1982) is an Indian professional football manager and former player who is the head coach of Indian Super League club Chennaiyin.

Miranda was an attacking midfielder who spent most of his career with Dempo in the National Football League and the I-League from 2000 to 2015. During his time with the Goan side, he won five league titles and four domestic cup honours. He was capped 45 times for the India national team from 2005 to 2014. He was a part of 2008 AFC Challenge Cup winning Indian team, thus qualifying for the AFC Asian Cup after 27 years. He also won two the SAFF Championship twice.

After retiring as a player, Miranda coached Goa Reserves and won the Goa Professional League title. He joined Goa an assistant coach in 2019, later took over the first-team as an in interim head coach in 2020 and won the league title. In 2022, Miranda was appointed as an assistant coach at Odisha. Promoted as an interim head coach in 2023, he won the Super Cup and qualification to AFC Cup group stage. In August 2023, he was appointed as the head coach of India national under-23 team.

== Club career ==
After starting his career with the Salcete FC, a team renowned in South Goa for being a nursery of young players. He moved to the prestigious Tata Football Academy in Jamshedpur where he honed his football skills for four years.

Clifford was the only TFA graduate from his batch to sign a professional contract when he signed for Dempo, a second division club in 2000. He helped Dempo lift the National League title five times and the Indian Federation Cup in 2004. He was also part of the team that played the 2008 AFC Cup semi-finals.

In July 2015 Miranda was drafted to play for Atlético de Kolkata in the 2015 Indian Super League.

== International career ==
Miranda made his senior international debut for India against Pakistan in 2005. During the Bob Houghton era, Miranda became a regular member of Houghton's team due to his ability to dribble and deliver deadly crosses from the left side of the field.

Miranda was a part of the Nehru Cup winning squads of 2007 and 2009 and helped Baichung Bhutia, the then captain of the Indian team lift the 2008 AFC Challenge Cup. He was also a member of the India team that participated in the 2011 Asia Cup in Qatar.

== Managerial career ==
=== Goa youth ===
Miranda retired from playing football in 2017 and went into coaching after being convinced to do so by his former coach, Derrick Pereira. He joined his former playing club Goa as an assistant to Pereira, club's director of youth development. In 2018, Miranda became the head coach of Goa Reserves side in the Goa Professional League and I-League 2nd Division. He won the 2018–19 Goa Professional League with the club.

=== Goa (assistant and interim) ===
Prior to 2019–20, Miranda was as appointed as an assistant coach with the senior team under Sergio Lobera. On 3 February 2020, he was appointed as the interim head coach after the club sacked Lobera. In charge of last three league matches and two playoff matches, he guided the club to league title and Goa became the first Indian club to qualify for AFC Champions League group stage. He continued at the club as an assistant coach till the end of 2021–22 season.

=== Odisha (assistant and interim) ===
On 28 June 2022, Miranda was appointed as an assistant coach at Indian Super League club Odisha. After head coach Josep Gombau parted ways with club at the end of the 2022–23 season, he was appointed as the interim head coach on 16 March 2023. He led Odisha to their first ever major title with a 2–1 win over Bengaluru in the 2023 Indian Super Cup final and became the first Indian coach to do so. He later led the club to a historic 2023–24 AFC Cup group stage qualification with a 3–1 win over Gokulam Kerala in the qualifier.

=== Mohun Bagan SG (assistant) ===
On 1 August 2023, Miranda was appointed as an assistant coach to Juan Ferrando at Mohun Bagan SG. He later took over as caretaker manager in the 2024 Indian Super Cup after the sacking of Ferrando.

=== India U23 ===
On 3 August 2023, Miranda was appointed as the head coach of India national under-23 team ahead of the 2024 AFC U-23 Asian Cup qualification.

=== Mumbai City FC (assistant) ===
On 1st July 2024 It was announced that Clifford Miranda would be Mumbai City FC's new assistant coach.

== Career statistics ==
=== International ===
Appearances and goals by national team and year
National team	Year	Apps	Goals
India
India	2005	3	0
India	2006	0	0
India	2007	6	0
India	2008	4	0
India	2009	0	0
India	2010	7	0
India	2011	10	3
India	2012	6	0
India	2013	7	3
India	2014	2	0
Total		45	6

Scores and results list India's goal tally first, score column indicates score after each Miranda goal

List of international goals scored by Clifford Miranda
Goal	Date	Venue	Opponent	Score	Result	Competition
1.	5 December 2011	Jawaharlal Nehru Stadium, Delhi	Bhutan	2–0	5–0	2011 SAFF Championship
2.	5 December 2011	Jawaharlal Nehru Stadium, Delhi	Bhutan	3–0	5–0	2011 SAFF Championship
3.	11 December 2011	Jawaharlal Nehru Stadium, Delhi	Afghanistan	2–0	4–0	2011 SAFF Championship
4.	6 February 2013	Jawaharlal Nehru Stadium, Kochi	Palestine	1–0	2–4	Friendly
5.	4 March 2013	Thuwunna Stadium, Yangon	Guam	1–0	4–0	2014 AFC Challenge Cup qualification
6.	19 November 2013	Kanchenjunga Stadium, Siliguri	Nepal	2–0	2–0	Friendly

== Managerial statistics ==
As of match played 31 October 2025

Managerial record by team and tenure
Team	From	To	Record								Ref.
Team	From	To	M	W	D	L	GF	GA	GD	Win %	Ref.
Goa (interim)	3 February 2020	30 April 2021	5	4	0	1	19	9	+10	80.00	
Odisha (interim)	16 March 2023	25 April 2023	6	5	1	0	14	5	+9	83.33	
India U23	3 August 2023	Present	2	0	0	2	1	5	−4	0.00	(Note: Matches in 2024 AFC U-23 Asian Cup qualification)
Mohun Bagan SG (caretaker)	9 January 2024	19 January 2024	3	2	0	1	5	5	+0	66.67	
Chennaiyin	18 October 2025	Present	3	0	1	2	1	7	−6	0.00	
Total			19	11	2	6	40	31	+9	57.89	

== Honours ==
=== Player ===
Dempo

- I-League: 2007–08, 2009–10, 2011–12
- National Football League: 2005, 2007
- Durand Cup: 2006
- Federation Cup: 2004
- Indian Super Cup: 2008, 2010

India

- AFC Challenge Cup: 2008
- SAFF Championship: 2005, 2011; runner-up: 2008, 2013
- Nehru Cup: 2007, 2012

=== Manager ===
Goa Reserves

- Goa Professional League: 2018–19

Goa

- Indian Super League Winners' Shield: 2019–20

Odisha

- Super Cup: 2023
