= Thierry Makon Nloga =

Cameroonian footballer

Personal information
- Date of birth: 9 October 1993 (age 33)
- Place of birth: Douala, Cameroon
- Height: 1.85 m (6 ft 1 in)
- Position: Midfielder

Senior career*
Years	Team	Apps	(Gls)
–2007	Aigle Royal Menoua		
2007–2011	Caïman Douala		
2011–2013	New Star	15	(10)
2014	Esperance Tunis	5	(0)
2015–2016	New Star		
2017	Bamboutos		
2018–2019	Coton Sport		
2019–2020	AS Kigali		
–2022	New Stars		

International career
2012–2013	Cameroon	10	(3)
- * Club domestic league appearances and goals as of 9 April 2015

Thierry Makon Nloga (born 9 October 1993) is a Cameroonian football player.

He played with Caïman Douala, New Star de Douala and Esperance Sportive de Tunis. He made a debut for the Cameroon national football team in an unofficial game in 2012, then in 2013 he made an appearance in an official match played on February 6 against Tanzania.

In August 2013, he joined Croatian side HNK Hajduk Split on trials.
