= Syed Rahim Nabi =

Indian footballer

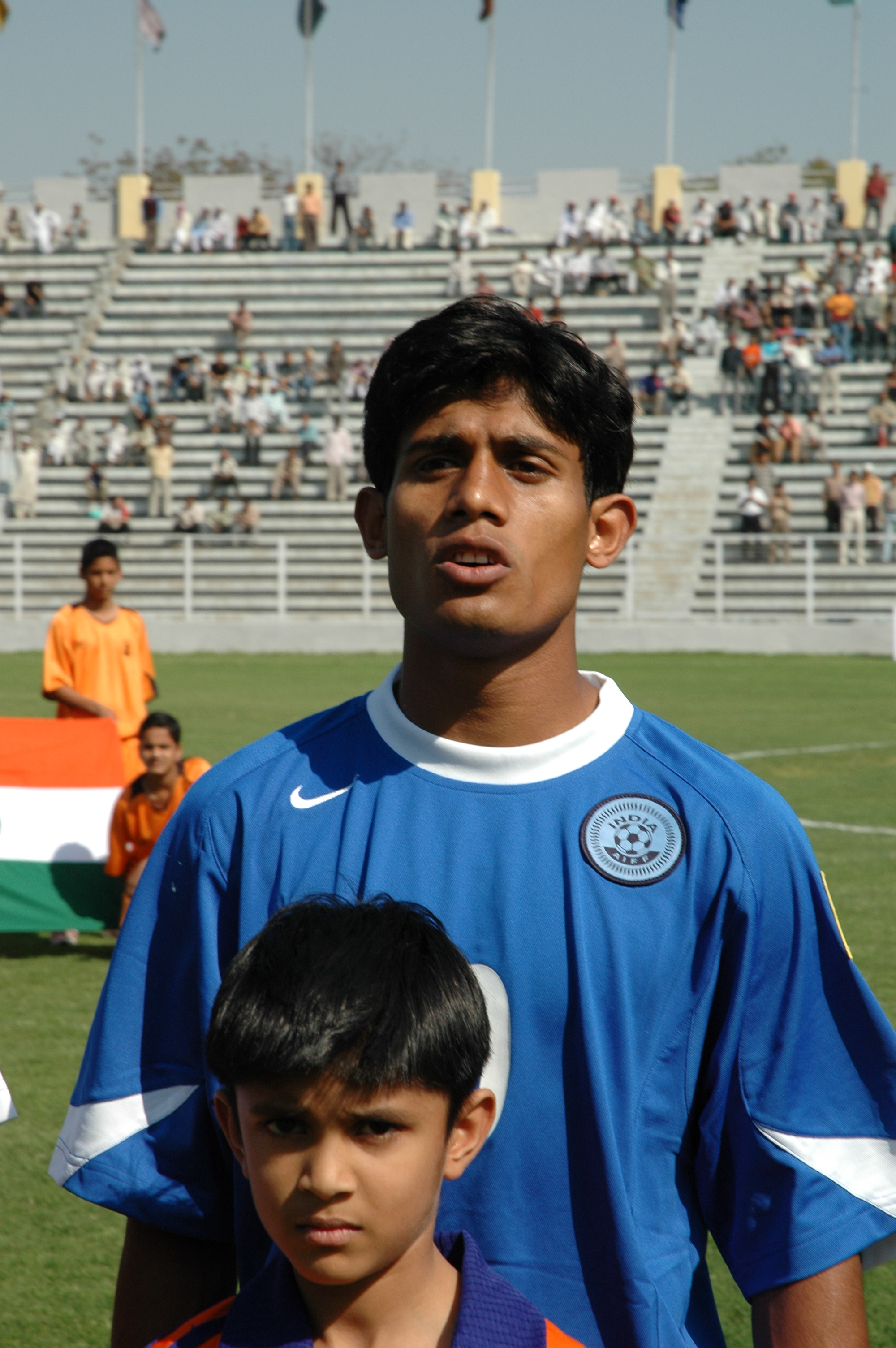
- Nabi lining up for India in 2007

Personal information
- Date of birth: 14 December 1985 (age 40)
- Place of birth: Pandua, Hooghly, West Bengal, India
- Height: 1.69 m (5 ft 7 in)
- Positions: Wing-back; winger

Team information
- Current team: Peerless SC
- Number: 28

Youth career
- 2001–2002: Tata FA

Senior career*
Years	Team	Apps	(Gls)
2002–2004	Mohammedan	31	(11)
2004–2011	East Bengal	113	(23)
2011–2013	Mohun Bagan	46	(4)
2013–2014	→Mohammedan (loan)	11	(0)
2014	→Mumbai City (loan)	8	(1)
2014–2015	Bharat	17	(0)
2015	→Atlético de Kolkata (loan)	2	(0)
2015–2016	Mumbai	2	(0)
2016–2019	Peerless	25	(3)

International career^{‡}
2006	India U23		
2004–2013	India	61	(7)
Medal record
India
Winner	SAFF Championship	2005
Winner	SAFF Championship	2011
Runner-up	SAFF Championship	2013
- * Club domestic league appearances and goals as of 4 August 2021 (UTC) ‡ National team caps and goals as of 4 August 2021 (UTC)

Syed Rahim Nabi (born 14 December 1985) is an Indian former footballer who primarily played as a midfielder for the India football team, though he could play as a striker and defender. Nabi last played for Peerless SC in the Calcutta Football League and won the tournament with the club.

== Club career ==
A product of the Tata Football Academy, Nabi started his career playing as a striker, then moved to midfield and then played as wing back. In recent international friendlies he has been playing as a fullback. Nabi's club career started with Mohammedan Sporting but later joined East Bengal in 2004.

After the 2012–13 season ended, Nabi signed with IMG-Reliance to join the Indian Super League. In 2013, he went to the United States on a trial with Major League Soccer side D.C. United but the signing did not materialize. On 30 October 2013, it was announced that Mohammedan S.C. has signed Nabi on loan.

In July 2015 Nabi was drafted to play for Atlético de Kolkata in the 2015 Indian Super League.

After two years gap, in 2017 Nabi again joined Mohammedan with a new challenge.

=== International career ===
Statistics accurate as of 21 November 2013.

National team	Year	Apps	Goals
India
India	2004	1	0
India	2005	4	0
India	2006	4	1
India	2007	0	0
India	2008	0	0
India	2009	1	0
India	2010	6	0
India	2011	19	3
India	2012	10	1
India	2013	5	2
Total		50	7

=== International goals ===
#	Date	Venue	Opponent	Score	Result	Competition
1.	18 February 2006	Mong Kok Stadium, Hong Kong	Hong Kong	2–2	2–2	Friendly
2.	13 November 2011	Indira Gandhi Athletic Stadium, Guwahati	Malaysia	1–1	1–1	Friendly
3.	5 December 2011	Jawaharlal Nehru Stadium, New Delhi	Bhutan	1–0	5–0	2011 SAFF Championship
4.	9 December 2011	Jawaharlal Nehru Stadium, New Delhi	Maldives	1–0	3–1	2011 SAFF Championship
5.	25 August 2012	Jawaharlal Nehru Stadium, New Delhi	Maldives	2–0	3–0	2012 Nehru Cup
6.	6 February 2013	Jawaharlal Nehru Stadium, Kochi	Palestine	2–1	2–4	Friendly
7.	5 September 2013	Dasarath Rangasala Stadium, Kathmandu	Nepal	2–1	2–1	2013 SAFF Championship

== Honours ==
India

- AFC Challenge Cup: 2008
- SAFF Championship: 2005, 2011; runner-up: 2013
- Nehru Cup: 2007, 2009, 2012

Individual

- AIFF Player of the year: 2012
