= Paul Bebey =

Cameroonian footballer (born 1986)

Personal information
- Full name: Paul Rolland Bebey Kingué
- Date of birth: 9 November 1986 (age 40)
- Place of birth: Douala, Cameroon
- Height: 1.84 m (6 ft 0 in)
- Position: Defender

Senior career*
| Years | Team | Apps | (Gls) |
| 2006–2008 | Douala AC | | |
| 2008–2009 | Les Astres | | |
| 2009 | Gaziantep B.B. | 3 | (0) |
| 2010–2011 | New Stars de Douala | | |
| 2011–2012 | Les Astres | | |
| 2012–2013 | Bleid-Gaume | | |
| 2013–2014 | Khayr Vahdat | 15 | (0) |
| 2015–2019 | Neman Grodno | 119 | (2) |

International career^{‡}
| 2008 | Cameroon U23 | 3 | (0) |
| 2012 | Cameroon | 6 | (0) |
- * Club domestic league appearances and goals as of 31 December 2019 ‡ National team caps and goals as of 7 January 2015

Paul Rolland Bebey Kingué (born 9 November 1986) is a Cameroonian former professional footballer.

== Career ==
In June 2006, Roland signed for Douala Athletic Club, before moving to Les Astres FC In 2011, he played for New Stars de Douala. Rolland has played for Bleid-Gaume since 2012.

In August 2013, Roland joined Tajik League side Khayr Vahdat FK with fellow Cameroonian Gock Habib.

=== International career ===
Bebey competed for the Cameroon national football team at the 2008 Summer Olympics.

He was called for the 2010 CEMAC Cup.

== Career statistics ==
=== Club ===
As of match played 2 November 2019

| Club | Season | League | | | National Cup | | Continental | | Other | | Total | |
| Club | Season | Division | Apps | Goals | Apps | Goals | Apps | Goals | Apps | Goals | Apps | Goals |
|---|---|---|---|---|---|---|---|---|---|---|---|---|
| Gaziantep B.B. | 2009–10 | TFF First League | 3 | 0 | 1 | 0 | – | | – | | 4 | 0 |
| Gaziantep B.B. | Total | | 3 | 0 | 1 | 0 | 0 | 0 | 0 | 0 | 4 | 0 |
| Khayr Vahdat | 2014 | Tajik League | 15 | 0 | | | – | | – | | 15 | 0 |
| Khayr Vahdat | Total | | 15 | 0 | 0 | 0 | 0 | 0 | 0 | 0 | 15 | 0 |
| Neman Grodno | 2015 | Vysheyshaya Liga | 19 | 1 | 3 | 0 | – | | – | | 22 | 1 |
| Neman Grodno | 2016 | Vysheyshaya Liga | 23 | 0 | 2 | 0 | – | | – | | 25 | 0 |
| Neman Grodno | 2017 | Vysheyshaya Liga | 25 | 1 | 1 | 0 | – | | – | | 26 | 1 |
| Neman Grodno | 2018 | Vysheyshaya Liga | 28 | 0 | 3 | 0 | – | | – | | 31 | 0 |
| Neman Grodno | 2019 | Vysheyshaya Liga | 24 | 0 | 1 | 0 | – | | – | | 25 | 0 |
| Neman Grodno | Total | | 119 | 2 | 10 | 0 | - | - | - | - | 129 | 2 |
| Career total | | | 137 | 2 | 11 | 0 | - | - | - | - | 148 | 2 |

=== International ===
Cameroon national team
| Year | Apps | Goals |
|---|---|---|
| 2012 | 1 | 0 |
| Total | 1 | 0 |

Statistics accurate as of match played 16 October 2012
