= Stéphane Kingué Mpondo =

Cameroonian footballer

Personal information
- Full name: Stéphane Kingué Mpondo
- Date of birth: June 2, 1985 (age 41)
- Place of birth: Bafoussam, Cameroon
- Height: 1.79 m (5 ft 10 in)
- Position: Midfielder

Team information
- Current team: Azam
- Number: 27

Senior career*
Years	Team	Apps	(Gls)
–2003	Bafoussam		
2003–2009	Cotonsport Garoua		
2009–2011	Ashdod	56	(2)
2011	Kairat	12	(0)
2012–2016	Cotonsport		
2017–	Azam		

International career^{‡}
2012–	Cameroon	13	(4)
- * Club domestic league appearances and goals as of 12 January 2018 ‡ National team caps and goals as of 12 January 2018

Stéphane Kingué Mpondo (born June 2, 1985) is a professional Cameroonian footballer currently playing for Azam.

== Career ==
He previously played for Cotonsport Garoua before signing a three-year contract with Ashdod in September 2009.

=== International statistics ===
Statistics accurate as of 30 January 2016.

Cameroon
Year	Apps	Goals
2012	1	0
2013	2	0
2014	0	0
2015	2	0
2016	4	0
Total	9	0
