= 2008 SAFF Championship squads =

Football tournament squads

The 2008 SAFF Championship was an international football tournament held in Sri Lanka and Maldives from 3 to 14 June 2008. The national teams involved in the tournament were required to register a squad of 20 players. The position listed for each player is per the squad list in the official match reports by the SAFF.

== Group A ==
=== India ===
Coach: (England) Bob Houghton

No.	Pos.	Player	Date of birth (age)	Caps	Goals	Club
	GK	Subhasish Roy Chowdhury	27 September 1986 (aged 21)	0	0	(All India Football Federation) Mahindra United
	GK	Subrata Pal	24 December 1986 (aged 21)	9	0	(All India Football Federation) East Bengal
	DF	Mahesh Gawli	23 January 1980 (aged 28)	43	1	(All India Football Federation) Dempo
	DF	N.S. Manju	9 May 1987 (aged 21)	21	2	(All India Football Federation) Mohun Bagan
	DF	Mehrajuddin Wadoo	12 February 1984 (aged 24)	12	1	(All India Football Federation) East Bengal
	DF	Anwar Ali	24 September 1984 (aged 23)	1	0	(All India Football Federation) JCT
	DF	Samir Subash Naik	8 August 1979 (aged 28)	17	0	(All India Football Federation) Dempo
	DF	Deepak Mondal	12 October 1979 (aged 28)	33	0	(All India Football Federation) Mohun Bagan
	DF	Gouramangi Singh	25 January 1986 (aged 22)	8	0	(All India Football Federation) Churchill Brothers
	MF	Pappachen Pradeep	28 April 1983 (aged 25)	18	6	(All India Football Federation) Mahindra United
	MF	Steven Dias	25 December 1983 (aged 24)	14	3	(All India Football Federation) Mahindra United
	MF	Climax Lawrence	16 January 1979 (aged 29)	32	2	(All India Football Federation) Dempo
	MF	Renedy Singh	20 June 1979 (aged 28)	36	3	(All India Football Federation) JCT
	MF	Sampath Kuttymani	28 September 1986 (aged 21)	2	0	(All India Football Federation) Mumbai
	MF	Bungo Thomchok Singh	2 March 1983 (aged 25)	3	0	(All India Football Federation) Churchill Brothers
	FW	Bhaichung Bhutia (captain)	15 December 1976 (aged 31)	56	17	(All India Football Federation) Mohun Bagan
	FW	Manjit Singh	25 January 1986 (aged 22)	9	0	(All India Football Federation) Mahindra United
	FW	Abhishek Yadav	10 June 1980 (aged 27)	22	3	(All India Football Federation) Mumbai
	FW	Sushil Kumar Singh	1 April 1981 (aged 27)	2	1	(All India Football Federation) Mahindra United
	FW	Sunil Chhetri	3 August 1984 (aged 23)	15	9	(All India Football Federation) JCT

=== Maldives ===
Coach: (Slovakia) Jozef Jankech

No.	Pos.	Player	Date of birth (age)	Caps	Goals	Club
	GK	Mohamed Imran	8 December 1980 (aged 27)	35	0	(Football Association of Maldives) Victory
	DF	Assad Abdul Ghanee	2 January 1976 (aged 32)	29	1	(Football Association of Maldives) New Radiant
	DF	Mohamed Jameel	4 October 1975 (aged 32)	32	1	(Football Association of Maldives) Club Valencia
	DF	Mohamed Shifan	8 March 1983 (aged 25)	6	1	(Football Association of Maldives) New Radiant
	DF	Mohamed Sobah	18 April 1980 (aged 28)	21	0	(Football Association of Maldives) New Radiant
	DF	Mohamed Nihan Nasir	16 April 1981 (aged 27)	8	0	(Football Association of Maldives) New Radiant
	DF	Ibrahim Amil	9 May 1978 (aged 30)	11	0	(Football Association of Maldives) New Radiant
	MF	Mohamed Ismail	16 March 1980 (aged 28)	10	0	(Football Association of Maldives) Victory
	MF	Ibrahim Fazeel	19 October 1980 (aged 27)	33	8	(Football Association of Maldives) Victory
	MF	Ahmed Ammaty Saeed	17 September 1980 (aged 27)	4	0	(Football Association of Maldives) Victory
	MF	Mukhthar Naseer	7 May 1979 (aged 29)	3	0	(Football Association of Maldives) Club Valencia
	MF	Ali Umar	5 August 1980 (aged 27)	32	10	(Football Association of Maldives) VB Addu
	MF	Shamveel Qasim	20 June 1982 (aged 25)	6	2	(Football Association of Maldives) New Radiant
	MF	Mohamed Bakka Arif	11 August 1985 (aged 22)	1	0	(Football Association of Maldives) Club Valencia
	FW	Ahmed Thoriq	4 October 1984 (aged 23)	12	6	(Football Association of Maldives) New Radiant
	FW	Ali Ashfaq	6 September 1985 (aged 22)	15	10	(Football Association of Maldives) VB Addu
	FW	Shinaz Hilmy	11 January 1984 (aged 24)	5	0	(Football Association of Maldives) Club Valencia

=== Nepal ===
Coach: (Germany) Thomas Flath

No.	Pos.	Player	Date of birth (age)	Caps	Goals	Club
	GK	Ritesh Thapa	2 October 1984 (aged 23)	8	0	(All Nepal Football Association) Mahendra Police
	GK	Bikash Malla	15 August 1986 (aged 21)	7	0	(All Nepal Football Association) Tribhuvan Army Club
	DF	Rakesh Shrestha	14 January 1977 (aged 31)	38	0	(All Nepal Football Association) Mahendra Police
	DF	Lok Bandhu Gurung	29 August 1985 (aged 22)	10	0	(All Nepal Football Association) Three Star Club
	DF	Anjan KC	14 December 1986 (aged 21)	10	0	(All Nepal Football Association) Three Star Club
	DF	Suman Subedi	27 July 1988 (aged 19)	3	0	(All Nepal Football Association) Mahendra Police
	DF	Biraj Maharjan	18 September 1990 (aged 17)	2	0	(All Nepal Football Association) New Road Team
	DF	Sandeep Rai	14 April 1989 (aged 19)	4	2	(All Nepal Football Association) Manang Marshyangdi
	DF	Chun Bahadur Thapa	13 December 1978 (aged 29)	4	0	(All Nepal Football Association) Tribhuvan Army Club
	DF	Sagar Thapa	21 November 1985 (aged 22)	16	0	(All Nepal Football Association) New Road Team
	DF	Bikash Singh Chhetri	13 January 1988 (aged 20)	1	0	(All Nepal Football Association) Three Star Club
	MF	Bishan Gauchan	11 May 1984 (aged 24)	10	0	(All Nepal Football Association) Three Star Club
	MF	Niranjan Khadka	6 October 1988 (aged 19)	3	0	(All Nepal Football Association) Manang Marshyangdi
	MF	Parbat Pandey	1 October 1979 (aged 28)	0	0	(All Nepal Football Association) Mahendra Police
	MF	Nirajan Rayamajhi	29 January 1980 (aged 28)	16	12	(All Nepal Football Association) New Road Team
	MF	Bijay Gurung	11 October 1985 (aged 22)	11	1	(All Nepal Football Association) Three Star Club
	MF	Ananta Raj Thapa	19 October 1977 (aged 30)	16	0	(All Nepal Football Association) Mahendra Police
	MF	Raju Tamang	27 October 1985 (aged 22)	8	0	(All Nepal Football Association) Tribhuvan Army Club
	FW	Ju Manu Rai	1 March 1983 (aged 25)	7	3	(All Nepal Football Association) Mahendra Police
	FW	Ramesh Budhathoki	11 April 1978 (aged 30)	9	0	(All Nepal Football Association) Mahendra Police

=== Pakistan ===
Coach: (Pakistan) Akhtar Mohiuddin

No.	Pos.	Player	Date of birth (age)	Caps	Goals	Club
	GK	Bilal Rafiq	19 October 1985 (aged 22)	0	0	(Pakistan Football Federation) PIA
	DF	Naveed Akram	16 May 1984 (aged 24)	18	0	(Pakistan Football Federation) WAPDA
	DF	Samar Ishaq	1 January 1986 (aged 22)	15	0	(Pakistan Football Federation) KRL
	DF	Muhammad Imran	15 October 1986 (aged 21)	20	0	(Pakistan Football Federation) Pakistan Army
	DF	Atif Bashir	3 April 1985 (aged 23)	0	0	(Football Association of Wales) Haverfordwest County
	DF	Muhammad Irfan	5 June 1984 (aged 23)	3	0	(Pakistan Football Federation) PIA
	DF	Kashif Siddiqi	25 January 1986 (aged 22)	0	0	(United States Soccer Federation) Presbyterian Blue Hose
	DF	Muhammad Ahmed	3 January 1988 (aged 20)	1	0	(Pakistan Football Federation) Wohaib
	DF	Zesh Rehman	14 October 1983 (aged 24)	6	0	(The Football Association) Queens Park Rangers
	MF	Zahid Hameed	1 August 1985 (aged 22)	17	1	(Pakistan Football Federation) WAPDA
	MF	Imran Niazi	17 November 1985 (aged 22)	13	0	(Pakistan Football Federation) WAPDA
	MF	Abdul Aziz	11 January 1986 (aged 22)	16	0	(Pakistan Football Federation) National Bank
	MF	Nasrullah Khan	1 March 1985 (aged 23)	0	0	(Pakistan Football Federation) PIA
	MF	Adnan Ahmed	7 June 1984 (aged 23)	5	1	(The Football Association) Tranmere Rovers
	MF	Jadid Khan Pathan	1 June 1989 (aged 19)	0	0	(Pakistan Football Federation) Afghan
	FW	Arif Mehmood	21 June 1983 (aged 24)	9	1	(Pakistan Football Federation) WAPDA
	FW	Farooq Shah	19 October 1985 (aged 22)	19	1	(Pakistan Football Federation) National Bank
	FW	Muhammad Qasim	20 August 1987 (aged 20)	6	4	(Pakistan Football Federation) KRL
	FW	Asif Mehmood	14 July 1988 (aged 19)	0	0	(Pakistan Football Federation) Pakistan Navy

== Group B ==
=== Afghanistan ===
Coach: (Germany) Klaus Stärk / (Afghanistan) Mohammad Yousef Kargar

No.	Pos.	Player	Date of birth (age)	Caps	Goals	Club
	GK	Shamsuddin Amiri	12 February 1985 (aged 23)	6	0	(Afghanistan Football Federation) Kabul Bank
	DF	Zohib Islam Amiri	2 May 1987 (aged 21)	5	0	(Afghanistan Football Federation) Kabul Bank
	DF	Ali Ahmad Yarzada	15 October 1985 (aged 22)	5	0	(Afghanistan Football Federation) Kabul Bank
	MF	Harez Habib	12 February 1982 (aged 26)	3	0	(German Football Association) FSC Lohfelden
	MF	Ata Yamrali	5 July 1982 (aged 25)	4	1	(German Football Association) ASV Bergedorf 85
	FW	Mustafa Hadid	25 August 1988 (aged 19)	0	0	(German Football Association) Eintracht Norderstedt

=== Bangladesh ===
Coach: (Bangladesh) Abu Yusuf

No.	Pos.	Player	Date of birth (age)	Caps	Goals	Club
1	GK	Aminul Haque	5 October 1980 (aged 27)	40	0	(Bangladesh Football Federation) Mohammedan
20	GK	Biplob Bhattacharjee	7 January 1981 (aged 27)	22	0	(Bangladesh Football Federation) Dhaka Abahani
2	DF	Arup Kumar Baidya	2 September 1987 (aged 20)	2	0	(Bangladesh Football Federation) Farashganj
3	DF	Wali Faisal	1 March 1985 (aged 23)	12	0	(Bangladesh Football Federation) Dhaka Abahani
4	DF	Rajani Kanta Barman	12 May 1976 (aged 32)	54	0	(Bangladesh Football Federation) Dhaka Abahani
19	DF	Mofazzal Hossain Shaikat	20 June 1986 (aged 21)	1	0	(Bangladesh Football Federation) Mohammedan
	DF	Ariful Islam	20 December 1987 (aged 20)	9	0	(Bangladesh Football Federation) Mohammedan
5	DF	Nazrul Islam	16 October 1978 (aged 29)	35	0	(Bangladesh Football Federation) Dhaka Abahani
6	DF	Hassan Al-Mamun	16 November 1974 (aged 33)	47	0	(Bangladesh Football Federation) Muktijoddha Sangsad
	DF	Atiqur Rahman Meshu	26 August 1988 (aged 19)	1	0	(Bangladesh Football Federation) Brothers Union
7	MF	Arman Aziz	10 May 1984 (aged 24)	21	0	(Bangladesh Football Federation) Mohammedan
8	MF	Anamul Haque Sharif	9 December 1985 (aged 22)	3	0	(Bangladesh Football Federation) Mohammedan
9	MF	Mamunul Islam	12 December 1988 (aged 19)	2	0	(Bangladesh Football Federation) Dhaka Abahani
13	MF	Arif Khan Joy (captain)	20 November 1971 (aged 36)	19	1	(Bangladesh Football Federation) Dhaka Abahani
16	MF	Mohamed Abul Hossain	29 July 1983 (aged 24)	18	3	(Bangladesh Football Federation) Dhaka Abahani
	MF	Faisal Mahmud	16 January 1983 (aged 25)	4	0	(Bangladesh Football Federation) Brothers Union
	MF	Zahid Parvez Chowdhury	29 December 1987 (aged 20)	7	0	(Bangladesh Football Federation) Dhaka Abahani
10	FW	Zahid Hasan Ameli	25 December 1987 (aged 20)	23	5	(Bangladesh Football Federation) Dhaka Abahani
12	FW	Mehedi Hasan Ujjal	26 April 1985 (aged 23)	22	0	(Bangladesh Football Federation) Dhaka Abahani
20	FW	Abdul Baten Mojumdar Komol	2 August 1987 (aged 20)	0	0	(Bangladesh Football Federation) Mohammedan

=== Bhutan ===
Coach: (Japan) Koji Gyotoku

No.	Pos.	Player	Date of birth (age)	Caps	Goals	Club
	GK	Jigme Singye	2 June 1974 (aged 34)	20	0	(Bhutan Football Federation) Yeedzin
	GK	Puspalal Sharma	25 June 1984 (aged 23)	4	0	(Bhutan Football Federation) Transport United
	DF	Pema Dorji	5 July 1985 (aged 22)	20	0	(Bhutan Football Federation) Yeedzin
	DF	Sangay Khandu	8 February 1985 (aged 23)	12	0	(Bhutan Football Federation) Transport United
	DF	Chencho Nio	3 March 1986 (aged 22)	12	0	(Bhutan Football Federation) Yeedzin
	DF	Pema Rinchen	14 April 1990 (aged 18)	3	0	(Bhutan Football Federation) Yeedzin
	DF	Tandin Tshering	1 January 1983 (aged 25)	6	0	(Bhutan Football Federation) Drukpol
	DF	Kinley Wangchuk	1 March 1984 (aged 24)	1	0	(Bhutan Football Federation) Yeedzin
	MF	Passang Tshering	16 July 1983 (aged 24)	19	2	(Bhutan Football Federation) Transport United
	MF	Nima Sangay	15 August 1984 (aged 23)	3	0	(Bhutan Football Federation) Drukpol
	MF	Gyeltshen Gyeltshen	7 June 1986 (aged 21)	6	0	(Bhutan Football Federation) Transport United
	MF	Kinley Dorji	30 August 1986 (aged 21)	20	0	(Bhutan Football Federation) Transport United
	FW	Wangay Dorji	9 January 1974 (aged 34)	17	5	(Bhutan Football Federation) Drukpol
	FW	Yeshey Dorji	2 January 1989 (aged 19)	3	0	(Bhutan Football Federation) Yeedzin

=== Sri Lanka ===
Coach: (South Korea) Jang Jung

No.	Pos.	Player	Date of birth (age)	Caps	Goals	Club
	GK	Sugath Dammika	6 October 1977 (aged 30)	23	0	(Football Federation of Sri Lanka) Ratnam
	GK	Asanka Viraj	17 May 1987 (aged 21)	3	0	(Football Federation of Sri Lanka) Saunders
	DF	Janaka Sanjaya Silva		4	0	(Football Federation of Sri Lanka) Sri Lanka Navy
	DF	Thuwan Raheem	11 September 1979 (aged 28)	5	0	(Football Federation of Sri Lanka) Sri Lanka Air Force
	DF	Well Ruwanthilaka	27 September 1984 (aged 23)	11	0	(Football Federation of Sri Lanka) Red Sun SC
	DF	Thilina Suranda	16 August 1985 (aged 22)	5	0	(Football Federation of Sri Lanka) Negombo Youth
	DF	Arachchige Pradeep Kumara	8 August 1982 (aged 25)	11	2	(Football Federation of Sri Lanka) Ratnam
	MF	Rawme Mohideen	5 June 1979 (aged 28)	8	0	(Football Federation of Sri Lanka) Ratnam
	MF	Chathura Madurangha	28 January 1981 (aged 27)	36	4	(Football Federation of Sri Lanka) Ratnam
	MF	Mohammed Asmeer	3 May 1983 (aged 25)	21	0	(Football Federation of Sri Lanka) Ratnam
	MF	Chathura Gunaratne	8 September 1982 (aged 25)	9	0	(Football Federation of Sri Lanka) Ratnam
	MF	Fazlur Rahuman	15 May 1977 (aged 31)	1	0	(Football Federation of Sri Lanka) Ratnam
	FW	Kasun Jayasuriya	25 March 1980 (aged 28)	46	16	(Football Federation of Sri Lanka) Ratnam
	FW	Channa Ediri Bandanage	22 September 1978 (aged 29)	50	12	(Football Federation of Sri Lanka) Ratnam
	FW	Chathura Lakruwan Samarasekara	22 December 1985 (aged 22)	3	0	(Football Federation of Sri Lanka) Saunders
	FW	Nimal Fernando Dehiwalage	12 October 1984 (aged 23)	3	2	(Football Federation of Sri Lanka) Negombo Youth
