= 2005 SAFF Gold Cup squads =

The 2005 South Asian Football Federation Gold Cup was an international football tournament held in Pakistan from 7 to 17 December 2005. The 8 national teams involved in the tournament were required to register a squad of 20 players.

The position listed for each player is per the squad list in the official match reports by the SAFF. The age listed for each player is on 7 December 2005, the first day of the tournament. The numbers of caps and goals listed for each player do not include any matches played after the start of the tournament. The club listed is the club for which the player last played a competitive match prior to the tournament. The nationality for each club reflects the national association (not the league) to which the club is affiliated. A flag is included for coaches who are of a different nationality than their own national team.

== Group A ==
=== Maldives ===
Coach: (Bulgaria) Yordan Stoykov

No.	Pos.	Player	Date of birth (age)	Caps	Goals	Club
1	GK	Ishaq Easa	13 August 1974 (aged 31)	0	0	(Football Association of Maldives) Hurriyya
18	GK	Imran Mohamed	18 December 1980 (aged 24)	28	0	(Football Association of Maldives) Victory
3	DF	Mohamed Sifan	8 March 1983 (aged 22)	0	0	(Football Association of Maldives) New Radiant
4	DF	Mohamed Nasir	16 April 1981 (aged 24)	5	0	(Football Association of Maldives) New Radiant
8	DF	Mohamed Jameel	4 October 1975 (aged 30)	22	1	(Football Association of Maldives) New Radiant
13	DF	Assad Abdul Ghanee (captain)	2 January 1976 (aged 29)	21	1	(Football Association of Maldives) Valencia
20	DF	Fareedh Mohamed	29 August 1982 (aged 23)	3	0	(Football Association of Maldives) Victory
21	DF	Sabah Mohamed	18 April 1980 (aged 25)	15	0	(Football Association of Maldives) New Radiant
24	DF	Mohamed Nimal		0	0	(Football Association of Maldives)
5	MF	Ibrahim Fazeel	9 October 1980 (aged 25)	29	5	(Football Association of Maldives) New Radiant
6	MF	Mohamed Arif	11 August 1985 (aged 20)	0	0	(Football Association of Maldives) Island
11	MF	Shamweel Qasim	20 June 1982 (aged 23)	0	0	(Football Association of Maldives) Island
12	MF	Hussain Habeeb	6 April 1980 (aged 25)	11	0	(Football Association of Maldives) Valencia
14	MF	Ahmed Saeed	4 May 1980 (aged 25)	1	0	(Football Association of Maldives) Victory
17	MF	Ashraf Luthfy	16 June 1973 (aged 32)	1	0	(Football Association of Maldives) Victory
7	FW	Ali Ashfaq	6 September 1985 (aged 20)	7	6	(Football Association of Maldives) Valencia
9	FW	Ahmed Thoriq	4 October 1980 (aged 25)	7	3	(Football Association of Maldives) New Radiant
10	FW	Ali Umar	5 August 1980 (aged 25)	24	8	(Football Association of Maldives) Valencia
16	FW	Ismail Mohamed	16 March 1980 (aged 25)	5	0	(Football Association of Maldives) Victory
19	FW	Shinaz Hilmy	11 January 1984 (aged 21)	0	0	(Football Association of Maldives) Hurriyya

=== Pakistan ===
Coach: (Bahrain) Salman Sharida

No.	Pos.	Player	Date of birth (age)	Caps	Goals	Club
1	GK	Jaffar Khan (captain)	10 February 1981 (aged 24)	19	0	(Pakistan Football Federation) Pakistan Army
25	GK	Muhammad Imran			?	(Pakistan Football Federation)
5	DF	Tanveer Ahmed	15 April 1976 (aged 29)	15	1	(Pakistan Football Federation) WAPDA
2	DF	Naveed Akram	16 May 1984 (aged 21)	3	0	(Pakistan Football Federation) Pakistan Army
21	DF	Yasir Afridi	27 July 1988 (aged 17)	0	0	(Pakistan Football Federation)
3	DF	Mehmood Khan	20 March 1981 (aged 24)	8	0	(Pakistan Football Federation) NBP
14	DF	Muhammad Imran	15 November 1986 (aged 19)	3	0	(Pakistan Football Federation) Pakistan Army
18	DF	Samar Ishaq	1 January 1986 (aged 19)	0	0	(Pakistan Football Federation) Panther Club
19	DF	Arif Masih	11 June 1989 (aged 16)	4	0	(Pakistan Football Federation) PTCL
4	DF	Zesh Rehman	14 October 1983 (aged 22)	0	0	(The Football Association) Fulham
6	MF	Zahid Hameed	1 August 1985 (aged 20)	5	0	(Pakistan Football Federation) WAPDA
13	MF	Farooq Shah	19 October 1985 (aged 20)	3	0	(Pakistan Football Federation) NBP
8	MF	Adeel Ahmed	25 November 1983 (aged 22)	9	0	(Pakistan Football Federation) PTCL
7	MF	Abdul Aziz	11 January 1986 (aged 19)	3	0	(Pakistan Football Federation) NBP
17	MF	Mudassar Saeed	3 July 1987 (aged 18)	0	0	(Pakistan Football Federation) Khan Research Laboratories
23	MF	Imran Niazi	17 November 1985 (aged 20)	0	0	(Pakistan Football Federation) WAPDA
10	FW	Muhammad Essa	20 November 1983 (aged 22)	11	2	(Pakistan Football Federation) Afghan FC Chaman
9	FW	Imran Hussain	10 March 1981 (aged 24)	2	0	(Pakistan Football Federation) Pakistan Army
12	FW	Arif Mehmood	21 June 1983 (aged 22)	5	1	(Pakistan Football Federation) WAPDA
26	FW	Farhan Abdul Qadir		0	0	(Pakistan Football Federation)

=== Afghanistan ===
Coach: (Germany) Klaus Stärk

No.	Pos.	Player	Date of birth (age)	Caps	Goals	Club
1	GK	Shamsuddin Amiri	12 February 1985 (aged 20)	0	0	(Afghanistan Football Federation) Kabul Bank
20	GK	Hamidullah Yousafzai	2 December 1981 (aged 24)	0	0	(Afghanistan Football Federation)
2	DF	Ali Ahmadi	12 August 1988 (aged 17)	1	0	(Afghanistan Football Federation)
3	DF	Bashir Ahmad Saadat	27 December 1981 (aged 23)	5	0	(Afghanistan Football Federation) Maiwand Kabul
4	DF	Qudratullah Hussaini	11 March 1984 (aged 21)	0	0	(Afghanistan Football Federation)
5	DF	Abdul Maroof Gullestani	8 June 1986 (aged 19)	2	0	(Afghanistan Football Federation)
8	DF	Ali Yarzada	15 October 1985 (aged 20)	0	0	(Afghanistan Football Federation)
14	DF	Manochahr Azizi	25 September 1984 (aged 21)	0	0	(Afghanistan Football Federation)
19	DF	Zohib Islam Amiri	15 February 1990 (aged 15)	0	0	(Afghanistan Football Federation) Shoa Kabul FC
6	MF	Israfeel Kohistani	5 June 1987 (aged 18)	0	0	(Afghanistan Football Federation) Ordu Kabul
7	MF	Sayed Maqsood Hashemi	5 March 1986 (aged 19)	0	0	(Afghanistan Football Federation)
12	MF	Farhad Reza Khan	16 May 1986 (aged 19)	0	0	(Afghanistan Football Federation)
13	MF	Raza Mahmoudi	12 May 1984 (aged 21)	2	0	(Afghanistan Football Federation)
15	MF	Ahmed Wahid Abbasi	20 August 1984 (aged 21)	0	0	(Afghanistan Football Federation) Maiwand Kabul
17	MF	Sayed Qasim Sharifi		0	0	(Afghanistan Football Federation)
18	MF	Sayed Bashir Azimi	27 May 1984 (aged 21)	0	0	(Afghanistan Football Federation)
9	FW	Hafizullah Qadami	20 February 1985 (aged 20)	0	0	(Afghanistan Football Federation) Kabul Bank
10	FW	Muhammad Jalal Afshar	13 April 1986 (aged 19)	0	0	(Afghanistan Football Federation)
11	FW	Souraj Akhwan	15 August 1983 (aged 22)	0	0	(Afghanistan Football Federation)
16	FW	Mustafa Bayat	30 November 1984 (aged 21)	0	0	(Afghanistan Football Federation)

=== Sri Lanka ===
Coach: Sampath Perera

No.	Pos.	Player	Date of birth (age)	Caps	Goals	Club
1	GK	S. D. Thilakaratne	6 October 1977 (aged 28)	14	0	(Football Federation of Sri Lanka) Ratnam
22	GK	M. A. M Azwar	5 October 1983 (aged 22)	1	0	(Football Federation of Sri Lanka) Java Lane
25	GK	Saman Dayawansa		0	0	(Football Federation of Sri Lanka)
2	DF	V. Dimudu Hettiarachchige	9 May 1983 (aged 22)	0	0	(Football Federation of Sri Lanka)
5	DF	Nalin Nanda Kumara	9 November 1974 (aged 31)	13	0	(Football Federation of Sri Lanka) Negombo Youth
23	DF	Dudley Lincoln Steinwall (captain)	9 November 1974 (aged 31)	37	3	(Football Federation of Sri Lanka) Negombo Youth
6	DF	Mohamed Izzadeen	17 January 1981 (aged 24)	3	0	(Football Federation of Sri Lanka) Ratnam
3	DF	K. Fuard	12 August 1979 (aged 26)	31	0	(Football Federation of Sri Lanka) Negombo Youth
17	MF	N. C. Abeysekara	22 June 1979 (aged 26)	8	1	(Football Federation of Sri Lanka) Renown
8	MF	B. A. Rajitha Jayavilal	22 July 1979 (aged 26)	4	0	(Football Federation of Sri Lanka) Sri Lanka Police
4	MF	K. N. Cristeen Fernando	7 August 1982 (aged 23)	4	0	(Football Federation of Sri Lanka) Jupiters
16	MF	M. M. A. I. K. Perera	11 January 1976 (aged 29)	23	2	(Football Federation of Sri Lanka) Saunders
14	MF	Rawmy Mohideen	5 June 1979 (aged 26)	4	0	(Football Federation of Sri Lanka) Ratnam
7	MF	Tharusha Rangana	22 November 1980 (aged 25)	0	0	(Football Federation of Sri Lanka)
10	FW	Channa Ediri Bandanage	22 September 1978 (aged 27)	35	10	(Football Association of Maldives) Victory
9	FW	G. P. C. Karunarathne	29 January 1972 (aged 33)	5	1	(Football Federation of Sri Lanka) Negombo Youth
18	FW	Sanjaya Pradeep Kumara	8 August 1982 (aged 23)	3	1	(Football Federation of Sri Lanka) Sri Lanka Police
15	FW	R. M. G. D. Rathnayake	25 August 1977 (aged 28)	7	1	(Football Federation of Sri Lanka)
12	FW	Mohammed Nazar Hameed	14 August 1981 (aged 24)	9	2	(Football Federation of Sri Lanka) Ratnam
11	FW	Kasun Jayasuriya	25 March 1980 (aged 25)	33	10	(All India Football Federation) Dempo

== Group B ==
=== Bangladesh ===
Coach: (Argentina) Andrés Cruciani

No.	Pos.	Player	Date of birth (age)	Caps	Goals	Club
1	GK	Aminul Haque	5 October 1980 (aged 25)	21	0	(Bangladesh Football Federation) Brothers Union
20	GK	Biplob Bhattacharjee	7 January 1981 (aged 24)	7	0	(Bangladesh Football Federation) Mohammedan
3	DF	Abu Ahmed Faysal	11 June 1972 (aged 33)	11	1	(Bangladesh Football Federation) Farashganj SC
19	DF	Mohammed Sujan	1 June 1982 (aged 23)	14	2	(Bangladesh Football Federation) Brothers Union
4	DF	Rajani Kanta Barman	12 May 1976 (aged 29)	21	0	(Bangladesh Football Federation) Muktijoddha Sangsad
14	DF	Anwar Parvez	25 February 1982 (aged 23)	12	0	(Bangladesh Football Federation) Brothers Union
2	DF	Firoz Mahmud Titu	8 July 1974 (aged 31)	18	1	(Bangladesh Football Federation) Muktijoddha Sangsad
5	DF	Nazrul Islam	16 October 1978 (aged 27)	18	0	(Bangladesh Football Federation) Mohammedan
6	DF	Hassan Al-Mamun	16 November 1974 (aged 31)	23	0	(Bangladesh Football Federation) Muktijoddha Sangsad
13	MF	Arif Khan Joy (captain)	20 November 1971 (aged 34)	10	1	(Bangladesh Football Federation) Abahani Limited Dhaka
15	MF	Arman Aziz	10 May 1984 (aged 21)	0	0	(Bangladesh Football Federation) Mohammedan
8	MF	Arman Mia	10 October 1977 (aged 28)	12	0	(Bangladesh Football Federation) Muktijoddha Sangsad
7	MF	Motiur Rahman Munna	1 September 1979 (aged 26)	24	2	(Bangladesh Football Federation) Mohammedan
16	MF	Mohamed Abul Hossain	29 July 1983 (aged 22)	0	0	(Bangladesh Football Federation) Brothers Union
10	FW	Alfaz Ahmed	6 June 1973 (aged 32)	32	9	(Bangladesh Football Federation) Mohammedan
17	FW	Mehedi Hasan Ujjal	26 April 1985 (aged 20)	2	0	(Bangladesh Football Federation) Abahani Limited Dhaka
9	FW	Ariful Kabir Farhad	12 March 1980 (aged 25)	7	3	(Bangladesh Football Federation) Mohammedan
12	FW	Shahajuddin Tipu	16 January 1974 (aged 31)	4	1	(Bangladesh Football Federation) Abahani Limited Dhaka
11	FW	Rokonuzzaman Kanchan	22 June 1982 (aged 23)	18	4	(Bangladesh Football Federation) Muktijoddha Sangsad
21	FW	Zahid Hasan Ameli	25 December 1987 (aged 17)	0	0	(Bangladesh Football Federation) Brothers Union

=== India ===
Coach: Syed Nayeemuddin

No.	Pos.	Player	Date of birth (age)	Caps	Goals	Club
1	GK	Sandip Nandy	15 January 1975 (aged 30)	2	0	(All India Football Federation) Mahindra United
22	GK	Kalyan Chaubey	16 December 1976 (aged 28)	0	0	(All India Football Federation) JCT
21	GK	Felix D'Souza	25 March 1980 (aged 25)	0	0	(All India Football Federation) Sporting Goa
17	DF	Irungbam Surkumar Singh	21 March 1983 (aged 22)	11	1	(All India Football Federation) Mahindra United
14	DF	Mahesh Gawli	23 January 1980 (aged 25)	27	0	(All India Football Federation) Mahindra United
3	DF	N.S. Manju	9 May 1987 (aged 18)	3	0	(All India Football Federation) Mahindra United
2	DF	Muttath Suresh	19 May 1978 (aged 27)	11	0	(All India Football Federation) East Bengal
11	DF	Rajib Ahmed		0	0	(All India Football Federation) Mohun Bagan
5	DF	Pappachen Pradeep	28 April 1983 (aged 22)	2	0	(All India Football Federation) SBT
4	DF	Mehrajuddin Wadoo	12 February 1984 (aged 21)	0	0	(All India Football Federation) Mohun Bagan
6	MF	Shanmugam Venkatesh	23 November 1978 (aged 27)	30	0	(All India Football Federation) Mahindra United
12	MF	Steven Dias	25 December 1983 (aged 21)	1	0	(All India Football Federation) Mahindra United
16	MF	James Lukram Singh	1 March 1981 (aged 24)	2	0	(All India Football Federation) Mahindra United
18	MF	Krishnan Nair Ajayan	30 May 1979 (aged 26)	1	0	(All India Football Federation) Mahindra United
7	MF	Mehtab Hossain	5 September 1985 (aged 20)	0	0	(All India Football Federation) Mohun Bagan
8	MF	Climax Lawrence	16 January 1979 (aged 26)	18	1	(All India Football Federation) Dempo
15	FW	Bhaichung Bhutia (captain)	15 December 1976 (aged 28)	35	11	(All India Football Federation) East Bengal
10	FW	Syed Rahim Nabi	14 December 1985 (aged 19)	5	0	(All India Football Federation) East Bengal
19	FW	Abdul Hakkim	5 April 1977 (aged 28)	4	2	(All India Football Federation) SBT
9	FW	Alvito D'Cunha	12 July 1978 (aged 27)	16	3	(All India Football Federation) East Bengal

=== Nepal ===
Coach: (Japan) Toshihiko Shiozawa

No.	Pos.	Player	Date of birth (age)	Caps	Goals	Club
1	GK	Upendra Man Singh (captain)	27 July 1973 (aged 32)	28	0	(All Nepal Football Association) Three Star
25	GK	Ritesh Thapa	2 April 1984 (aged 21)	2	0	(All Nepal Football Association) Nepal Police
20	GK	Bikash Malla	15 August 1986 (aged 19)	0	0	(All Nepal Football Association) Manang Marshyangdi
3	DF	Rakesh Shrestha	14 January 1977 (aged 28)	20	0	(All Nepal Football Association) Nepal Police
4	DF	Janak Singh	28 March 1985 (aged 20)	0	0	(All Nepal Football Association) Three Star
14	DF	Tashi Tsering	22 April 1973 (aged 32)	0	0	(All Nepal Football Association) Manang Marshyangdi
19	DF	Sagar Thapa	21 November 1985 (aged 20)	3	0	(All Nepal Football Association) Manang Marshyangdi
6	DF	Lok Bandhu Gurung	29 August 1985 (aged 20)	0	0	(All Nepal Football Association) Three Star
5	DF	Anjan KC	10 December 1986 (aged 18)	0	0	(All Nepal Football Association) Friends
16	MF	Nabin Neupane	13 October 1982 (aged 23)	6	0	(All Nepal Football Association) Manang Marshyangdi
8	MF	Rajesh Khadagi	31 January 1980 (aged 25)	8	0	(All Nepal Football Association) Three Star
17	MF	Pradeep Maharjan	11 October 1986 (aged 19)	0	0	(All Nepal Football Association) Three Star
13	MF	Vishad Gauchan	11 May 1984 (aged 21)	0	0	(All Nepal Football Association) Three Star
23	MF	Bijaya Gurung	11 October 1985 (aged 20)	0	0	(All Nepal Football Association) Three Star
9	MF	Raju Tamang	27 October 1985 (aged 20)	0	0	(All Nepal Football Association) Nepal Army Club
21	MF	Pralaya Raj Bhandari	12 November 1986 (aged 19)	0	0	(All Nepal Football Association) Three Star
11	FW	Hari Khadka	26 November 1976 (aged 29)	32	13	(All Nepal Football Association) Nepal Police
7	FW	Surendra Tamang	23 February 1981 (aged 24)	2	0	(All Nepal Football Association) Three Star
12	FW	Ramesh Budhathoki	11 April 1978 (aged 27)	6	0	(All Nepal Football Association) Three Star
10	FW	Basanta Thapa	10 April 1977 (aged 28)	20	4	(All Nepal Football Association) Manang Marshyangdi

=== Bhutan ===
Coach: Khare Basnet

No.	Pos.	Player	Date of birth (age)	Caps	Goals	Club
1	GK	Jigme Singye	8 June 1981 (aged 24)	10	0	(Bhutan Football Federation) Transport United
20	GK	Karma Thinley		0	0	(Bhutan Football Federation)
4	DF	Pema Dorji	5 July 1985 (aged 20)	11	0	(Bhutan Football Federation) Transport United
3	DF	Tandin Tshering	30 June 1986 (aged 19)	0	0	(Bhutan Football Federation)
2	DF	Sangay Khandu	7 September 1985 (aged 20)	4	0	(Bhutan Football Federation) Transport United
15	DF	Ugyen Dorji	6 July 1985 (aged 20)	2	0	(Bhutan Football Federation) Thimphu
13	DF	Sonam Tenzin	20 October 1986 (aged 19)	6	0	(All India Football Federation) Buddhist Blue Stars
6	DF	Kinley Wangchuk	1 March 1984 (aged 21)	0	0	(Bhutan Football Federation)
5	MF	Passang Tshering	16 July 1983 (aged 22)	11	1	(Bhutan Football Federation) Transport United
16	MF	Nawang Dhendup	7 December 1983 (aged 22)	8	0	(Bhutan Football Federation) Transport United
7	MF	Kinley Dorji	30 August 1986 (aged 19)	12	0	(Bhutan Football Federation) Thimphu
10	MF	Wangay Dorji	9 January 1974 (aged 31)	5	5	(Bhutan Football Federation) Drukpol
11	MF	Ugyen Wangchuk	10 October 1974 (aged 31)	5	0	(Bhutan Football Federation)
21	MF	Subash Mongar		0	0	(Bhutan Football Federation)
18	MF	Wangay Dorji	9 January 1974 (aged 31)	9	5	(Bhutan Football Federation) Drukpol
17	MF	Ugyen Tsheten		0	0	(Bhutan Football Federation)
12	FW	Pema Chophel	6 August 1981 (aged 24)	9	1	(Bhutan Football Federation) Drukpol
9	FW	Bikash Pradhan	7 February 1981 (aged 24)	0	0	(Bhutan Football Federation) Thimphu
8	FW	Novin Gurung		0	0	(Bhutan Football Federation)
19	FW	Sonam Penjor		0	0	(Bhutan Football Federation)
