= India national football team =

Men's association football team

India
- Nicknames: The Blue Tigers
- Association: All India Football Federation (AIFF)
- Confederation: AFC (Asia)
- Sub-confederation: SAFF (South Asia)
- Head coach: Khalid Jamil
- Captain: Gurpreet Singh Sandhu
- Most caps: Sunil Chhetri (157)
- Top scorer: Sunil Chhetri (95)
- Home stadium: Various
- FIFA code: IND
First colours	Second colours

FIFA ranking
- Current: 141 ▼3 (18 November 2026)
- Highest: 94 (February 1996)
- Lowest: 173 (March 2015)

First international
- Pre-independence: Australia 5–3 India (Sydney, Australia; 3 September 1938); Post-independence: India 1–2 France (London, England; 31 July 1948)

Biggest win
- India 7–0 Sri Lanka (Bengaluru, India; 7 December 1963)

Biggest defeat
- Soviet Union 11–1 India (Moscow, Soviet Union; 16 September 1955)

Olympic Games
- Appearances: 4 (first in 1948)
- Best result: Fourth place (1956)

Asian Cup
- Appearances: 5 (first in 1964)
- Best result: (silver) Runners-up (1964)

Asian Games
- Appearances: 11 (first in 1951)
- Best result: (gold) Gold medal (1951, 1962)

CAFA Nations Cup
- Appearances: 1 (first in 2025)
- Best result: (bronze) Third place (2025)

SAFF Championship
- Appearances: 14 (first in 1993)
- Best result: (gold) Winners (1993, 1997, 1999, 2005, 2011, 2015, 2021, 2023)
Medal record
Men's football
AFC Asian Cup
Silver medal – second place	1964 Israel	Team
Asian Games
Gold medal – first place	1951 New Delhi	Team
Gold medal – first place	1962 Jakarta	Team
Bronze medal – third place	1970 Bangkok	Team
AFC Challenge Cup
Gold medal – first place	2008 India	Team
SAFF Championship
Gold medal – first place	1993 Pakistan	Team
Gold medal – first place	1997 Nepal	Team
Gold medal – first place	1999 India	Team
Gold medal – first place	2005 Pakistan	Team
Gold medal – first place	2011 India	Team
Gold medal – first place	2015 India	Team
Gold medal – first place	2021 Maldives	Team
Gold medal – first place	2023 India	Team
Silver medal – second place	1995 Sri Lanka	Team
Silver medal – second place	2008 Maldives & Sri Lanka	Team
Silver medal – second place	2013 Nepal	Team
Silver medal – second place	2018 Bangladesh	Team
Bronze medal – third place	2003 Bangladesh	Team
South Asian Games
Gold medal – first place	1985 Dhaka	Team
Gold medal – first place	1987 Calcutta	Team
Gold medal – first place	1995 Madras	Team
Silver medal – second place	1993 Dhaka	Team
Bronze medal – third place	1989 Islamabad	Team
Bronze medal – third place	1999 Kathmandu	Team
CAFA Nations Cup
Bronze medal – third place	2025 Tajikistan and Uzbekistan	Team
- Website: www.the-aiff.com

The India national football team represents India in international football and is governed by the All India Football Federation (AIFF) and is under the global jurisdiction of FIFA. It is governed in Asia by the Asian Football Confederation (AFC) and in South Asia by South Asian Football Federation (SAFF) — both of which were co-founded by the AIFF.

During the 1950s and early 1960s, under the coaching of Syed Abdul Rahim, India won the gold medal at the 1951 and 1962 Asian Games while finishing fourth at the 1956 Summer Olympics. India has never participated in the FIFA World Cup, although they did qualify by default for the 1950 World Cup after all other nations in their qualification group withdrew. However, India withdrew prior to the beginning of the tournament. The team has also appeared five times in the AFC Asian Cup, Asia's top football championship and finished as runners-up in 1964. India also participates in the SAFF Championship, the top regional football competition in South Asia. They have won the tournament record eight times since its inception in 1993.

In the 21st century, besides the SAFF Championship triumphs, under the guidance of Bob Houghton, India won the Nehru Cup in 2007, 2009 and the 2008 AFC Challenge Cup. The Challenge Cup victory allowed India to once again qualify for the Asian Cup after 27 years from 1984.

== History ==
=== Early days (1930s–1940s) ===
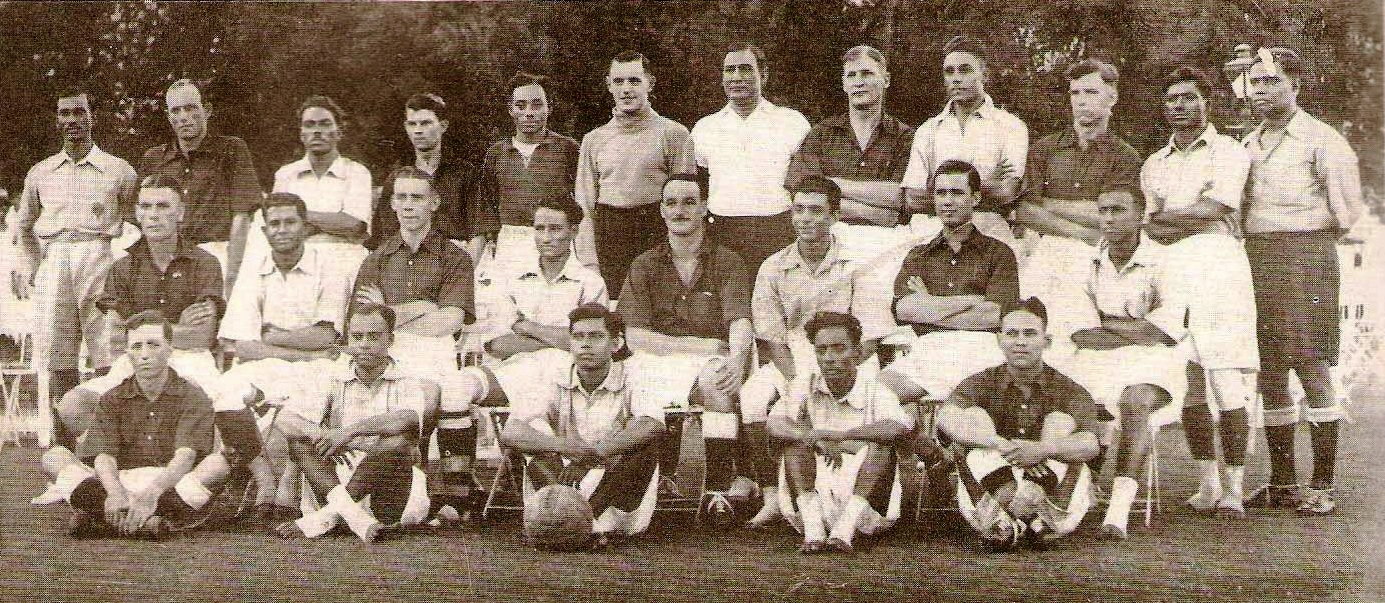
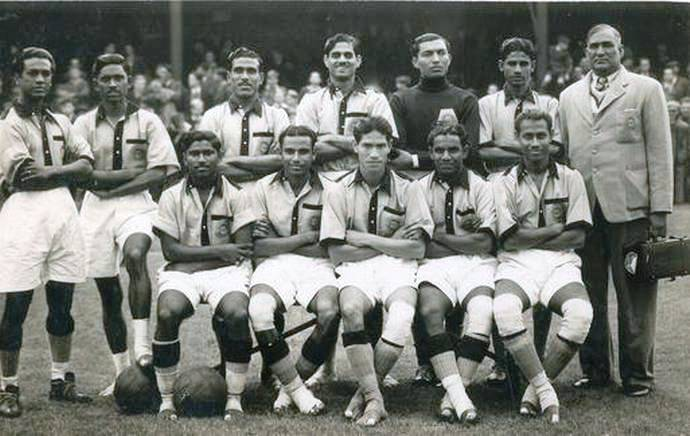
In the top image, Indian team (in white jersey) and all European team (in black jersey), together before a match held in Calcutta on 1 July 1938. In bottom image, India side that participated in the 1948 Olympics' match against France.

The first foreign tour by the Indian football team was to Ceylon in 1933. India beat Ceylon 1–0 in first match of the tour. Though it was an All-Bengal team, it was an Indian team by all means.

The second known official international tour of the Indian team, which at that time consisted of both Indian and British players, was to South Africa in 1934 when it was led by Indian footballer Gostha Pal.

The football team of the Muhammadan Sporting Club Calcutta visited Ceylon in 1935.

Football teams consisting of entirely Indian players started to tour Australia, Japan, Indonesia, and Thailand during the late 1930s.

In the year 1938, India carried out a lengthy tour of Australia at the request of the Australian Football Association. From August to October, they played 17 matches against various state, district, and club teams, and 5 friendly matches against the Australian national team. The first of these, on 3 September in Sydney, is India's first international game to be recognised by FIFA, and ended in a 5–3 defeat. After drawing the second match in Brisbane 4–4, India won the third match at Newcastle 4–1 to claim their first international win.

The national team played their first match as an independent nation in the first round of the 1948 Summer Olympics against France, in a 2–1 defeat. Famously, the Indian team did not wear boots, playing either barefoot or in socks, something that would be banned by FIFA later in the year.

The following year, the national team visited Ceylon once again, winning all six matches, as well as playing two against Ceylon, winning both 1–0 and 6–1 respectively.

=== Golden years (1950s–1960s) ===
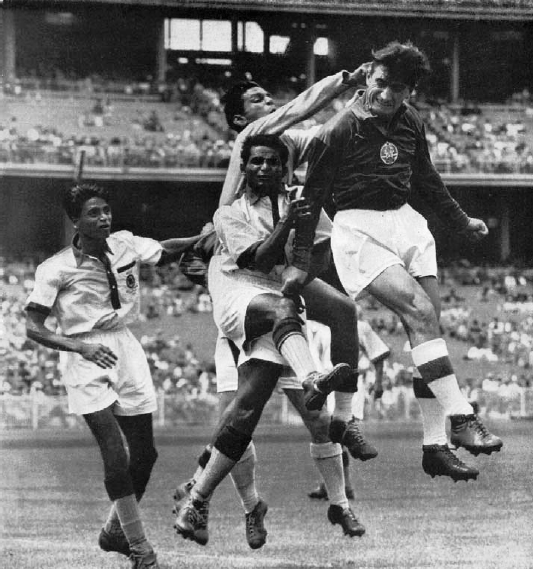
Indian team at a tussle against Bulgaria at the 1956 Olympics.

In 1950, India managed to qualify for the 1950 FIFA World Cup, which was scheduled to take place in Brazil, after all the other teams in their qualifying group withdrew. However, India themselves withdrew from the tournament shortly before it began; officially, this was due to travel costs, but FIFA had offered to pay the team's travel expenses, and the real reason behind their withdrawal has been widely speculated in the decades since. While it was commonly believed that India withdrew due to FIFA's ban on playing barefoot, the team's captain at that time, Sailen Manna, insisted that this was not the case; it is now generally accepted that India withdrew simply because they valued the Olympics more than the World Cup and did not view the latter as being prestigious enough to justify taking part. Since then, India have yet to qualify for another World Cup.

Despite not participating in the World Cup in 1950 and opting not to even play the Asian zone qualifiers until 1985, the following years until 1964 are usually considered to be the "golden era" of the Indian football. India, coached by Hyderabad City Police head coach Syed Abdul Rahim, became one of the best teams in Asia. In March 1951, Rahim led India to their first ever triumph during the 1951 Asian Games, hosted in India. The team defeated Iran 1–0 in the gold medal match to win their first trophy. Sahu Mewalal scored the winning goal for India in that match. The following year, India competed in the 1952 Olympic Games in Helsinki, but were unused to the cold conditions and lost 10–1 to Yugoslavia. Following this defeat, the AIFF made it mandatory for footballers to wear boots. After taking the defeat in Helsinki Finland, India participated in various minor tournaments, such as the Asian Quadrangular Football Tournament, which they won four times from 1952 to 1955.

In 1954, India returned to the Asian Games as defending champions in Manila. Despite their achievement three years prior, India was unable to go past the group stage as the team finished second in Group C during the tournament, two points behind Indonesia. Two years later, at the 1956 Summer Olympics, India went on to achieve the team's greatest result in a competitive tournament. The team finished in fourth place during the Summer Olympics football tournament, losing the bronze-medal match to Bulgaria 3–0. The tournament is also known for Neville D'Souza's hat-trick against Australia in the quarterfinals. D'Souza's hat-trick was the first scored by an Asian in Olympic history. India defeated Australia by 4–2 in that match at the Olympic Park Stadium.

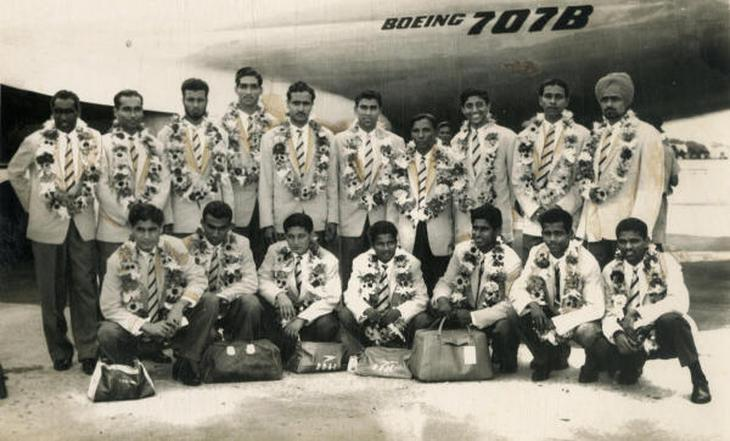
The Indian squad before their departure for Jakarta and the 1962 Asiad.

After their good performance during the Summer Olympics, India participated in the 1958 Asian Games in Tokyo. The team once again finished fourth, losing the bronze-medal match to Indonesia 4–1. The next year the team travelled to Malaysia where they took part in the 1959 Merdeka tournament and finished as the tournament runners-up.

India began the 1960s with the 1960 AFC Asian Cup qualifiers. Despite the qualifiers for the West Zone being held in Kochi, India finished last in their qualification group and thus missed out the tournament. Despite the set-back, India went on to win the gold medal during the Asian Games for the second time in 1962. The team defeated South Korea 2–1 to win their second major championship.

Two years later, following their Asian Games triumph, India participated in the 1964 AFC Asian Cup after all the other teams in their qualification group withdrew. Despite their automatic entry into the continental tournament, India team managed to finish as the runners-up during the tournament, losing out to the hosts, Israel, by two points. This remains India's best performance in the AFC Asian Cup.

=== Decline (1970s–2000) ===
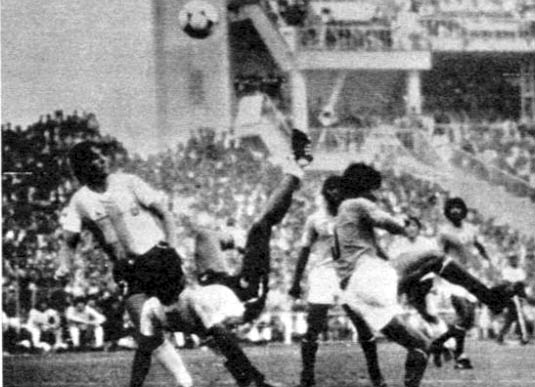
India vs Argentina match at the Eden Gardens during the 1984 Nehru Cup.

India returned to the Asian Games in 1966. Despite their performance two years prior during the AFC Asian Cup, India could not go beyond the group stage as the team finished third, behind Japan and Iran. Four years later, during the 1970 Asian Games, India came back and took third place during the tournament. The team defeated Japan 1–0 during the bronze-medal match.

In 1974, India's performance in the Asian Games once again sharply declined as they finished the 1974 edition in last place in their group, losing all three matches, scoring two, and conceding 14 goals in the first round. India then showed steady improvement during the 1978 tournament, finishing second in their group of three. The team were then knocked-out in the next round, finishing last in their group with three defeats from three matches. The 1982 tournament proved to be better for India as the side managed to qualify for the quarter-finals before losing to Saudi Arabia 1–0. In 1984, India managed to qualify for the AFC Asian Cup for the first time since their second place triumph in 1964. During the 1984 tournament, India finished in last place in their five team group in the first round. India's only non-defeat during the tournament came against Iran, a 0–0 draw.

Despite India's decline from a major football power in Asia, the team still managed to assert its dominance as the top team in South Asia. India managed to win the football competition of the South Asian Games in 1985 and then again won the gold medal in 1987. The team then began the 1990s by winning the inaugural SAFF Championship in 1993 and silver medal at the 1993 South Asian Games. In February 1996, India achieved its highest FIFA ranking of 94, under Bhaichung Bhutia's captaincy. The team ended the 20th century by winning the SAFF Championship again in 1997 and 1999.

=== Resurgence (2001–2011) ===
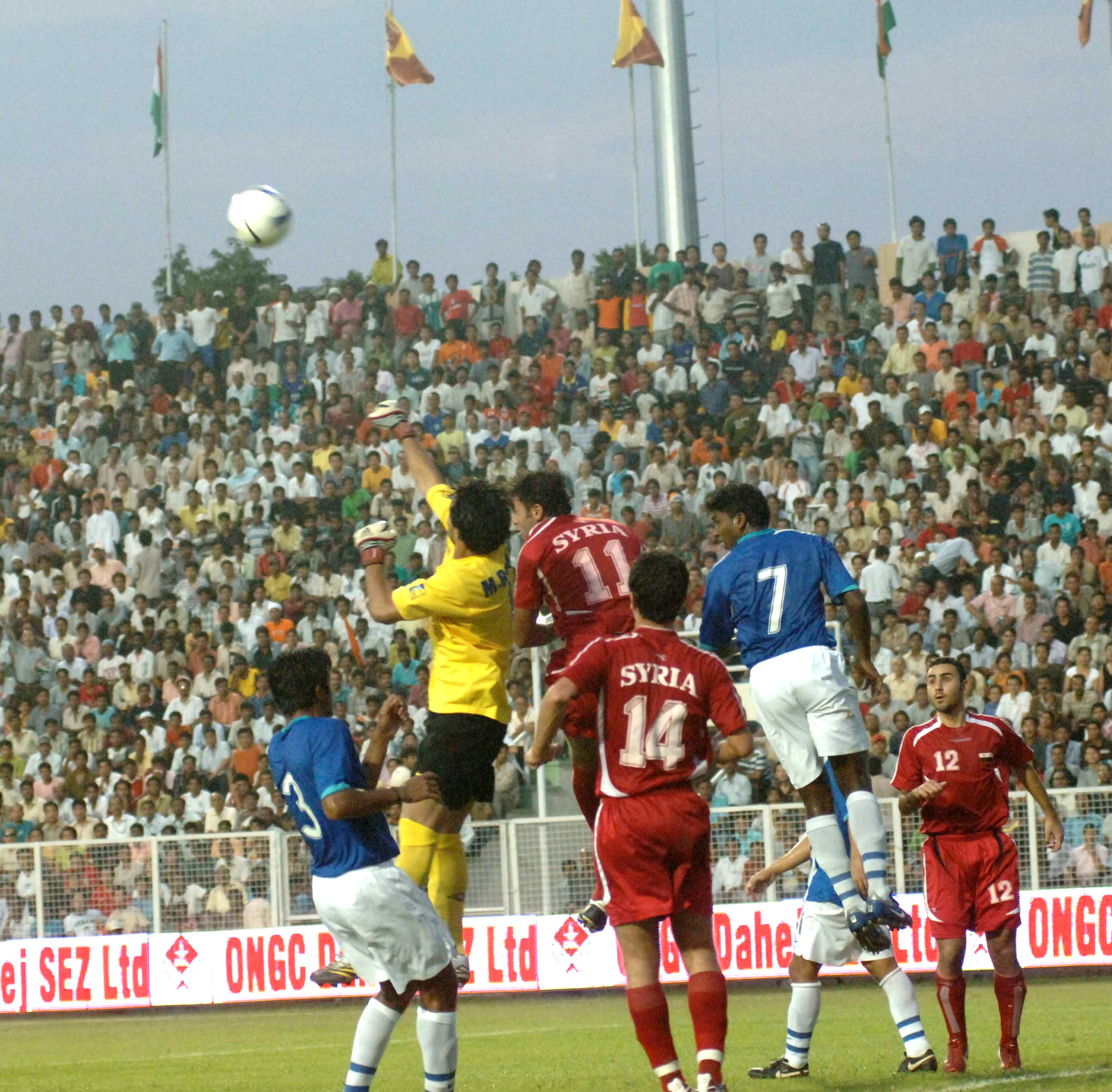
India playing against Syria at the 2007 Nehru Cup.

India's first competitive matches of the 21st century were the 2002 FIFA World Cup first round qualifiers. India took a very bright start, defeating the United Arab Emirates 1–0, drawing Yemen 1–1, as well as two victories over Brunei, including a 5–0 victory in Bangalore. However, they finished a point away from qualification for the next round. In 2003, India took part in the 2003 SAFF Championship. The team qualified for the semi-finals but fell to Bangladesh 2–1.

Later in 2003, India participated in the Afro-Asian Games being held in Hyderabad. Under the coaching of Stephen Constantine, India managed to make it to the final of the tournament after defeating Zimbabwe, a team ranked 85 places above India in the FIFA rankings at the time, 5–3. Despite the major victory, during the gold-medal match India were defeated 1–0 by Uzbekistan. Because of this achievement, Constantine was voted as the Asian Football Confederation's Manager of the Month for October 2003. The tournament result also gave India more recognition around the country and around the world.

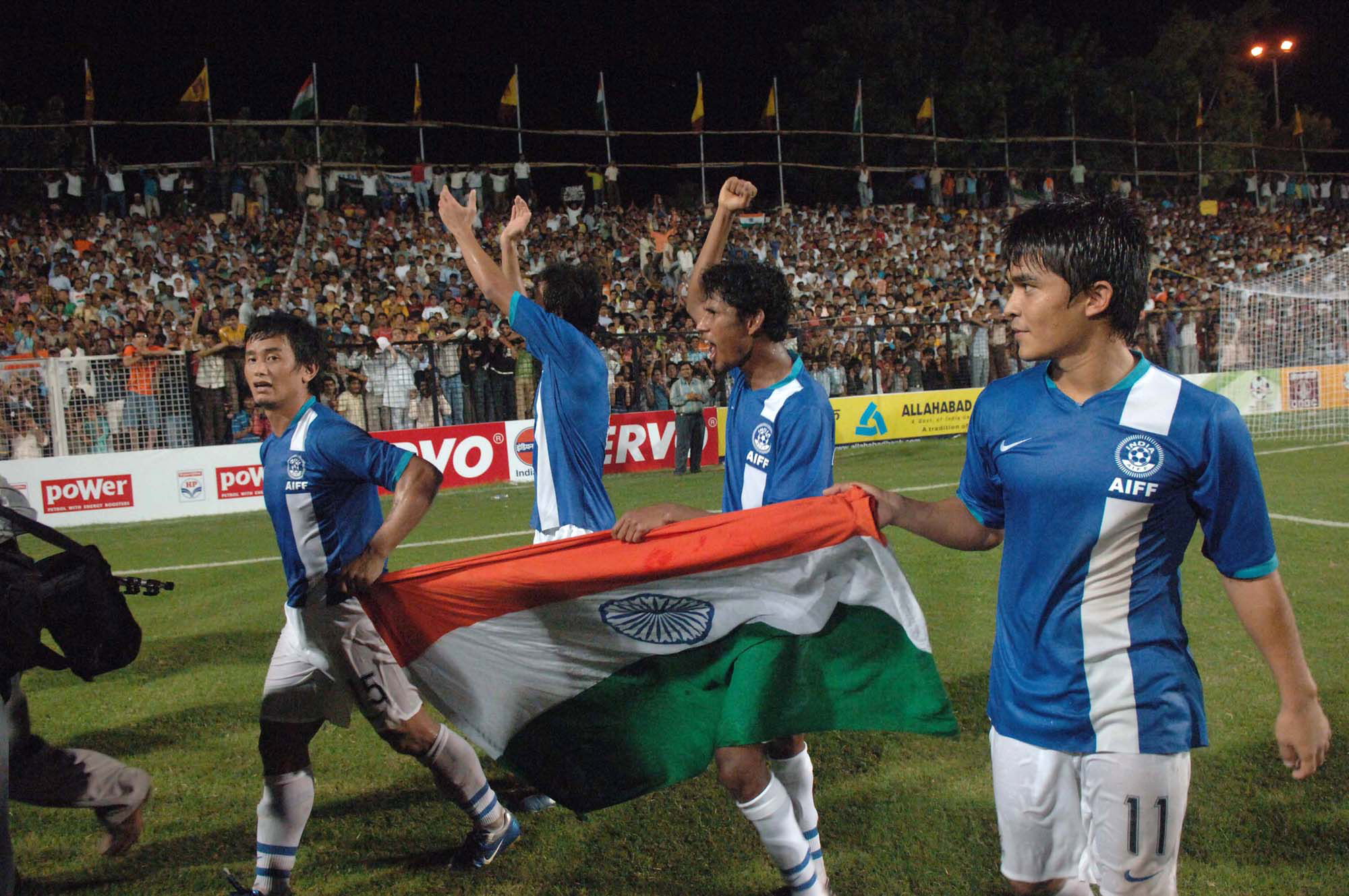
The captain of Indian Football team, Bhaichung Bhutia, celebrating along with other players after winning the 2007 Nehru Cup final.

Constantine was replaced by Syed Nayeemuddin in 2005 but the Indian head coach only lasted for a little over a year as India suffered many heavy defeats during the 2007 AFC Asian Cup qualifiers. During this time India were defeated 6–0 by Japan, 3–0 by Saudi Arabia and Yemen respectively at home, and 7–1 away in Jeddah. Former Malmö and China coach Bob Houghton was brought in as head coach in May 2006.

Under Houghton, India witnessed massive improvement in their football standing. In August 2007, Houghton won the country the restarted Nehru Cup after India defeated Syria 1–0 in the final. Pappachen Pradeep scored the winning goal for India that match. The next year, Houghton led India during the 2008 AFC Challenge Cup, which was hosted in Hyderabad and Delhi. During the tournament, India breezed through the group stage before defeating Myanmar in the semi-finals. In the final against Tajikistan, India, through a Sunil Chhetri hat-trick, won the match 4–1. The victory not only earned India the championship but it also allowed India to qualify for the 2011 AFC Asian Cup, the nation's first Asian Cup appearance in 27 years. In order to prepare for the Asian Cup, Houghton had the team stay together as a squad for eight months from June 2010 until the start of the tournament, meaning the players would not play for their clubs.

India were drawn into Group C for the Asian Cup with Australia, South Korea, and Bahrain. Even though they stayed together as a team for eight months, India lost all three of their matches during the Asian Cup, including a 4–0 defeat to Australia. Despite the results, India were praised by fans and pundits for their valiant efforts during the tournament.

=== Recent history (2011–2018) ===
After participating the 2011 AFC Asian Cup, India's campaign to qualify for the 2015 Asian Cup began in February 2011 with the AFC Challenge Cup qualifiers. Bob Houghton decided to change the makeup of the India squad, replacing many of the older players from the Asian Cup with some young players from the AIFF development side in the I-League, Indian Arrows. Even with a young side, India managed to qualify for the AFC Challenge Cup. Despite qualifying for the AFC Challenge Cup, the AIFF decided to terminate the contract of Bob Houghton as he was charged with racial abuse towards referee which ultimately resulted in his resignation as the head coach of India.

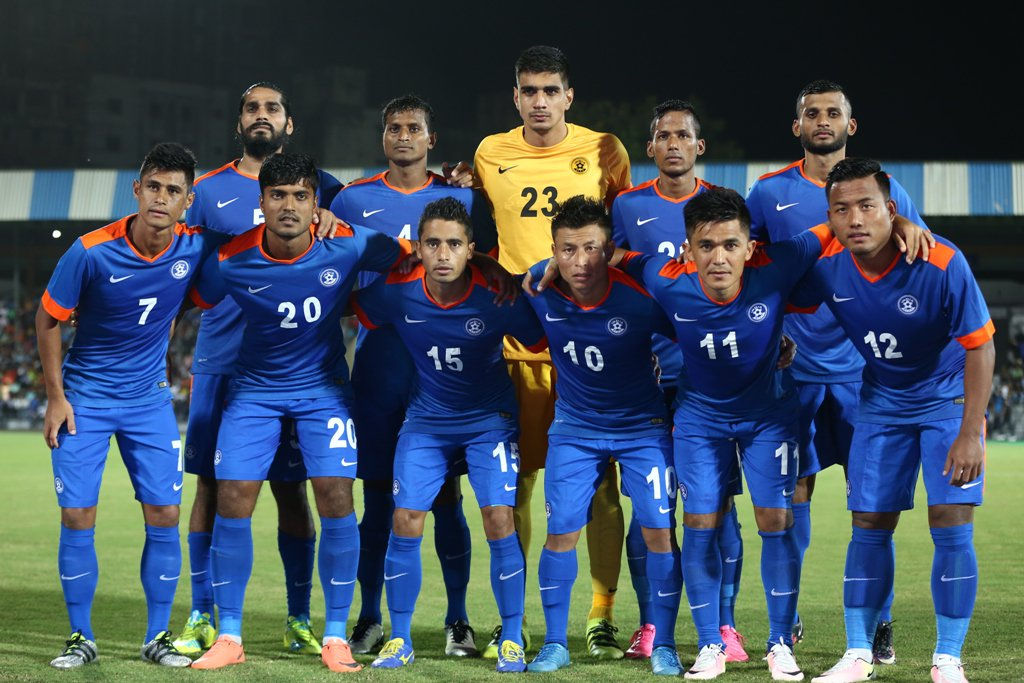
India starting XI in a friendly match against Puerto Rico in September 2016.

After having Dempo coach Armando Colaco as interim head coach, the AIFF signed Savio Medeira as head coach in October 2011. Medeira led India to another SAFF Championship victory, but also to their worst performance in the AFC Challenge Cup in March 2012. The team lost all three of their group matches, unable to score a single goal during the tournament. After the tournament, Medeira was replaced as head coach by Dutchman, Wim Koevermans. Koevermans' first job as head coach was the 2012 Nehru Cup. India won their third successive Nehru Cup, defeating Cameroon on penalties.

In March 2013, India failed to qualify for the 2014 AFC Challenge Cup and thus also failed to qualify for the 2015 AFC Asian Cup. The team also failed to retain the SAFF Championship, losing 2–0 to Afghanistan in the 2013 final. After more bad results in friendlies, Koevermans resigned as head coach in October 2014.

By March 2015, after not playing any matches, India reached their lowest FIFA ranking position of 173. A couple months prior, Stephen Constantine was re-hired as the head coach after first leading India more than a decade before. Constantine's first major assignment back as the India head coach were the 2018 FIFA World Cup qualifiers. After making it through the first round of qualifiers, India crashed out during the second round, losing seven of their eight matches and thus, once again, failed to qualify for the World Cup.

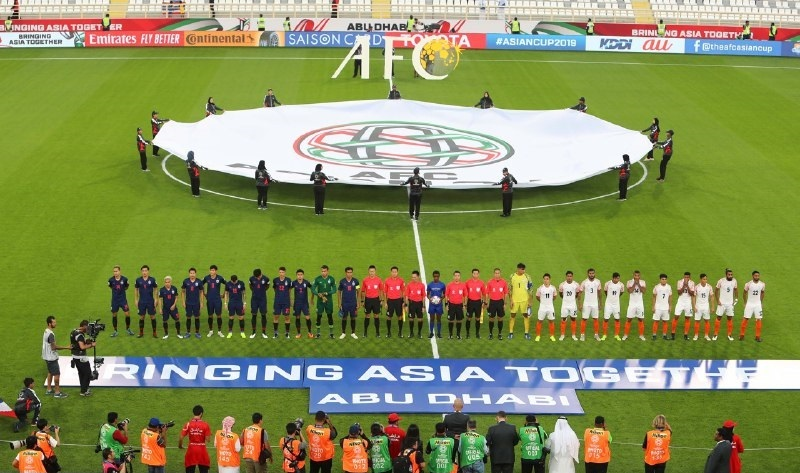
India against Thailand at the 2019 AFC Asian Cup.

Despite failure to qualify for the World Cup, India managed to reach the third round of 2019 AFC Asian Cup qualifiers after defeating Laos in the play-off round on aggregate 7–1. On 11 October 2017, India secured qualification for the 2019 AFC Asian Cup after a 4–1 victory over Macau. In 2017, India remained undefeated by drawing two and winning seven games, which helped the team to reach 96 in the FIFA ranking in May, which is its second highest FIFA rank ever.

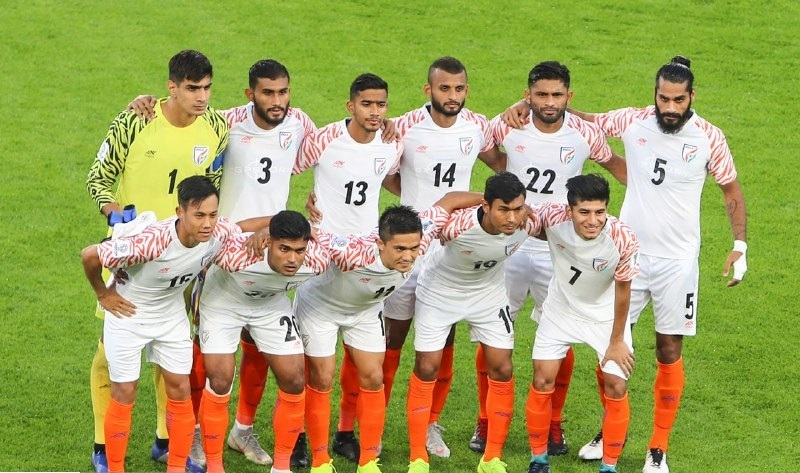
India playing XI against Thailand at 2019 AFC Asian Cup.

Though defeated at the 2018 SAFF Championship final 1–2 against Maldives in September 2018, India regained the momentum with some friendlies against China, Jordan and Oman as they began the 2019 AFC Asian Cup with a 4–1 victory against Thailand; this was their biggest ever win at the Asia Cup, and their first in 55 years. Nevertheless, they lost both of their next two group matches against UAE and Bahrain 0−2 and 0−1 respectively and finished at the bottom of the group, thus failed to move to knock out stage. Stephen Constantine immediately resigned from his position as head coach following the failure to progress further in the tournament.

=== Igor Štimac era (2019–2024) ===
On 15 May 2019, the AIFF announced former Croatian player and coach Igor Štimac as the team's head coach after the departure of Stephen Constantine. His first major assignment with India was 2022 World Cup qualification, where it began with a 1–2 home loss to Oman. But in the second match they earned a respectable point after managing a goalless draw against the 2019 Asian Champion and 2022 FIFA World Cup host Qatar. However, in the third match, the home leg against Bangladesh saw them managing a disappointing 1−1 draw. A similar result was repeated in the away leg against Afghanistan. In the away leg, India lost yet again to Oman by a solitary goal, thus shortening their hopes to qualify for the next round. After several postponements due to COVID-19, the team finally flew to Doha to play their remainder of games. In the return leg against Qatar, India went down to the hosts with a single goal and got knocked out of the World Cup qualification tournament with two games to spare. The team then made a comeback by winning their next match against Bangladesh 2–0, and ended their campaign with a 1–1 draw against Afghanistan. With seven points in total, India finished third on the table behind Qatar and Oman, thus getting eliminated from the World Cup during the second round. However they were qualified into the third round of 2023 AFC Asian Cup qualification.

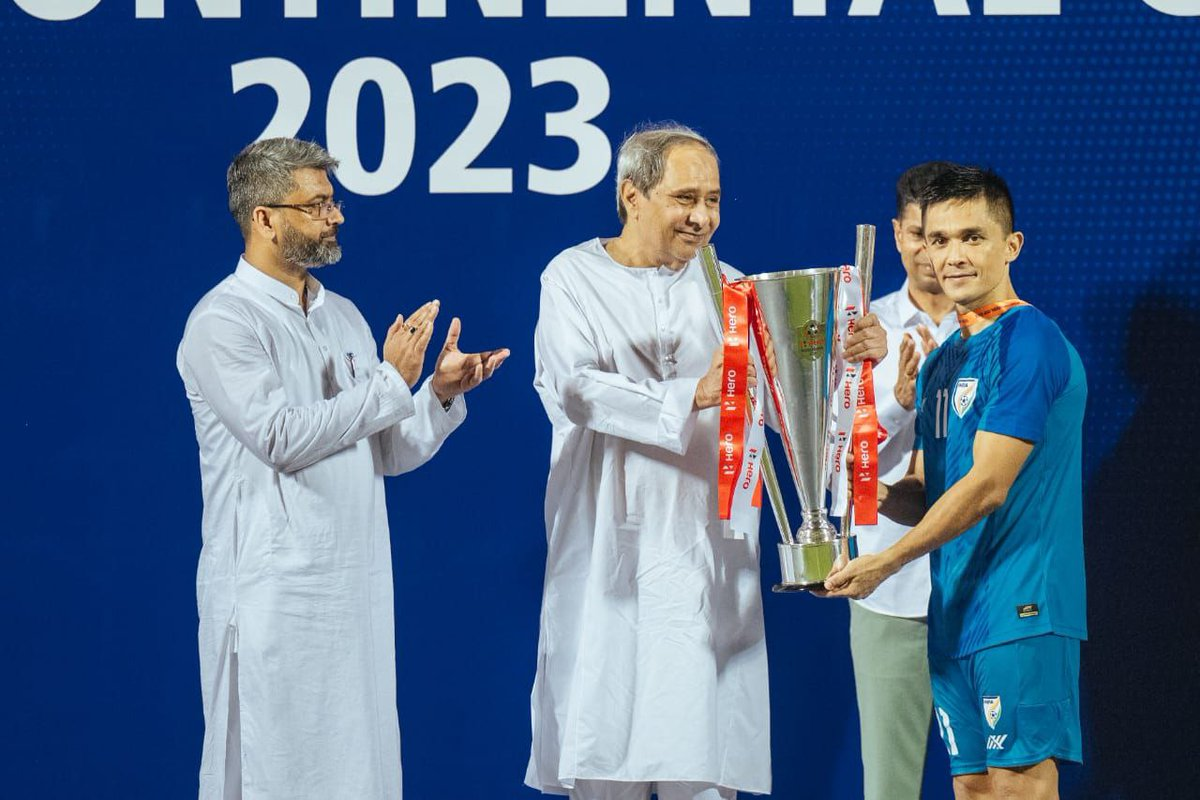
Odisha CM Naveen Patnaik handing the 2023 Intercontinental Cup trophy to Sunil Chhetri.

In the third round of the 2023 AFC Asian Cup qualification, India was drawn in the same group with Afghanistan, Hong Kong and Cambodia. Due to the COVID-19 pandemic, India was chosen as the host of the group of the qualifiers while the qualification was reduced into a single round robin format. Using this home advantage, India was able to top the group with three wins against Cambodia (2–0), Afghanistan (2–1) and Hong Kong (4–0), therefore for the first time, India qualified for two consecutive AFC Asian Cups in history. In September 2022, India participated for the first time in the VFF Cup where they played two friendly matches, a 1–1 draw against Singapore and a 3–0 defeat by Vietnam, ending their year . In 2023, India began their campaign by winning the 2023 Tri-Nation Series and the 2023 Intercontinental Cup, both were organized by AIFF. India beat Myanmar 1–0 and Kyrgyzstan 2–0 in the Tri-Nation series, and defeated Lebanon 2–0 in the final of Intercontinental Cup to win the title for the second time. Following the Tri-Nation Series and the Intercontinental Cup, India won the 2023 SAFF championship, their third title in the year 2023 at home soil. India defeated Pakistan 4–0 and Nepal 2–0 and drawn 1–1 against Kuwait in the group stage. After defeating Lebanon in penalty shoot-out in the semi–finals, India faced Kuwait again in the tournament for the final. The match was tied 1–1 till the added time and eventually India defeated Kuwait in the penalty shoot-out to lift the SAFF Cup for a record nine times. Sunil Chhetri was the highest goal scorer of the edition with 5 goals, including a hat-trick against Pakistan, his fourth for the national team. With this hat-trick, he scored 92 goals becoming the second-highest international goalscorer from Asia of all time. His tally of 92 put him as the fourth-highest goalscorer in the history of international football.

Heading to the 2023 AFC Asian Cup tournament, India was the only national team without any friendly match as preparation. India ended up losing all matches in the group stage against Australia (0–2), Uzbekistan (0–3), and Syria (0–1), without scoring any goals.

On the 2026 World Cup qualification India was drawn in group A of the second round with Afghanistan, Kuwait and Qatar. India started its journey topping the group with Qatar after winning against Kuwait 1–0, in which ended up being the only victory of the team in the group. Since then the performances only got downhill, collecting losses against Qatar (0–3 and 1–2) and a shocking loss against Afghanistan 1–2, with the other two results left being draws against Kuwait and Afghanistan, both ending up 0–0. India finished the group placed third behind Qatar and Kuwait and failed to qualify for the next round.

On 17 June 2024, the AIFF terminated Štimac's contract, thus ending up his career with The Blue Tigers.

=== Márquez era (2024–2025) ===
On 20 July 2024, the AIFF announced that Manolo Márquez would become the head coach of the India national football team while maintaining his duties with FC Goa for the upcoming ISL season. His first assignment was the 2024 Intercontinental Cup against Mauritius and Syria.

Marquez's first win came on 19 March 2025, following a 3–0 win against Maldives with goals from Rahul Bheke, Liston Colaco, and Sunil Chhetri. This win also ended the Blue Tigers' 489-day winless streak.

On 2 July 2025, the AIFF technical committee announced that they had agreed a mutual termination of Marquez's contract.

=== Jamil appointment (2025–present) ===
On 1 August 2025, the AIFF announced the appointment of Khalid Jamil as head coach, making him the first Indian head coach of the national team since Savio Medeira left the role in 2012.

India was invited as a guest team to participate in the 2025 CAFA Nations Cup. Under Khalid’s first match, he led India to a 2–1 victory over Tajikistan, marking the team's first win against Tajikistan in 17 years. In the third place match vs Oman, the score ended 1–1 with India winning on penalties 3–2. This marked India's first victory against Oman in 31 years, and winning India the third place medal.

India was unable to qualify for the third consecutive AFC Asian Cup, after four matches without a win and only two draws in the third round of 2027 AFC Asian Cup qualification. In their next game, India lost 1–0 to neighbours Bangladesh. This was the first time the team had lost to Bangladesh since 2003, ending a 22-year unbeaten record against them.

== Team image ==
=== Nicknames ===
India is officially known by the nickname The Blue Tigers since 2013. It is inspired by the colour blue which forms the primary colour of the team's home kit, depicting Ashoka Chakra's colour in the national flag (similar to the Indian national teams of other sports) and the tiger which is the national animal of India.

=== Kit and colours ===
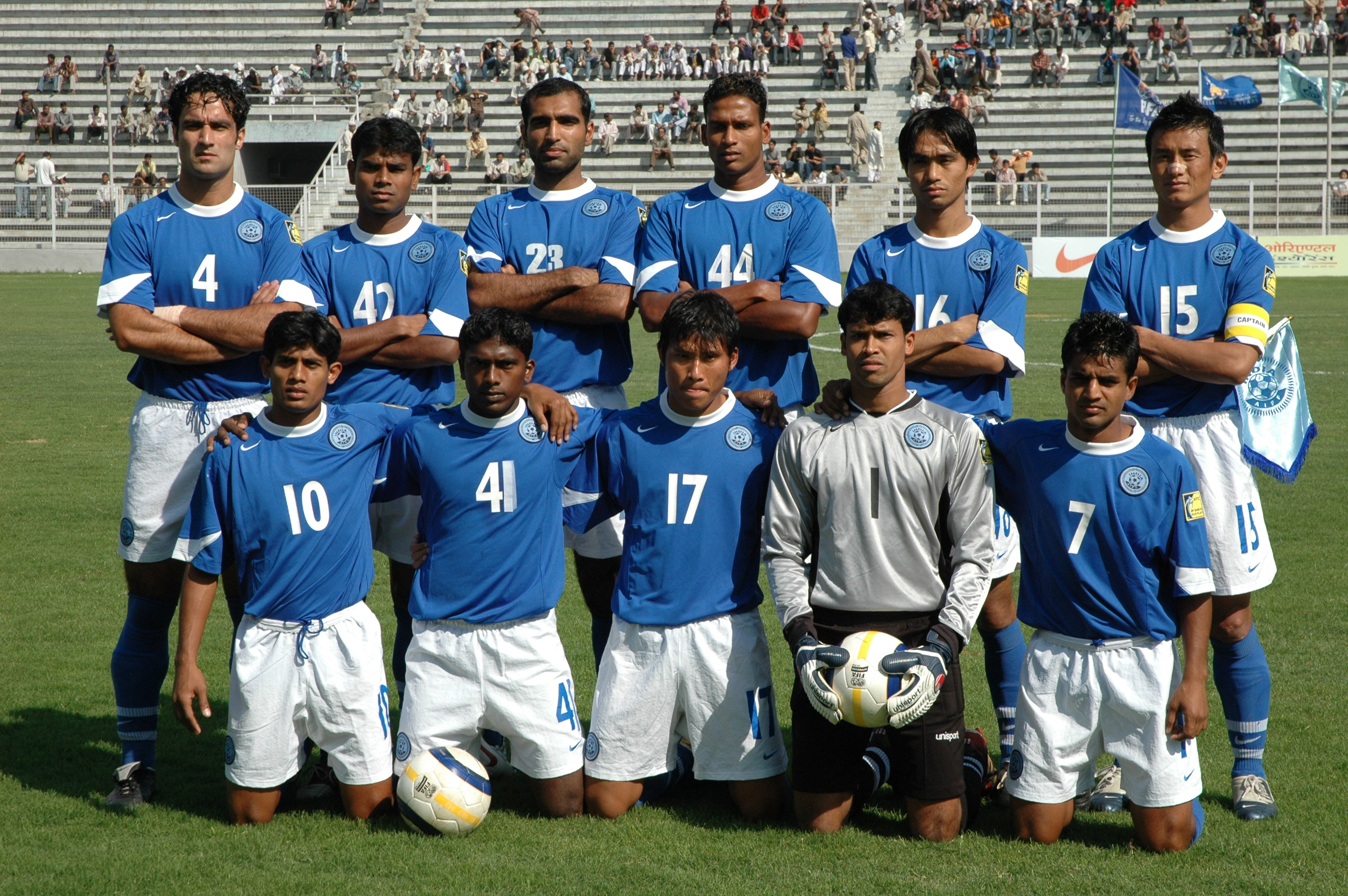
India in 2007, wearing their traditional blue jersey

After four years with Adidas, the AIFF signed an agreement for seven years with American company Nike on 27 February 2006. For the 2011 AFC Asian Cup, in which India were participating, Nike designed India's kit using the same template it used for other national teams such as Brazil. In January 2013. it was announced that the AIFF's deal with Nike was extended for an extra five years. In September 2017, prior to the India U17 side's participation in the FIFA U-17 World Cup, Nike unveiled an all sky blue kit for the India senior and youth teams. A year later, on 17 December 2018, it was announced that Indian manufacturer SIX5SIX would replace Nike as India's kit maker. In becoming India's new kit makers, Six5Six also became the first manufacturer to pay for the rights to produce India kits, after both Nike and Adidas didn't pay. Six5Six unveiled their first jerseys for the team before the 2019 AFC Asian Cup, from which the home colour had a similar sky blue shade and the away colour was changed to white from orange. Both jerseys had a unique design embellished on the sleeves representing tiger stripes to pay homage to the Indian football fans, who affectionately calls the team "Blue Tigers".

=== Home stadiums ===
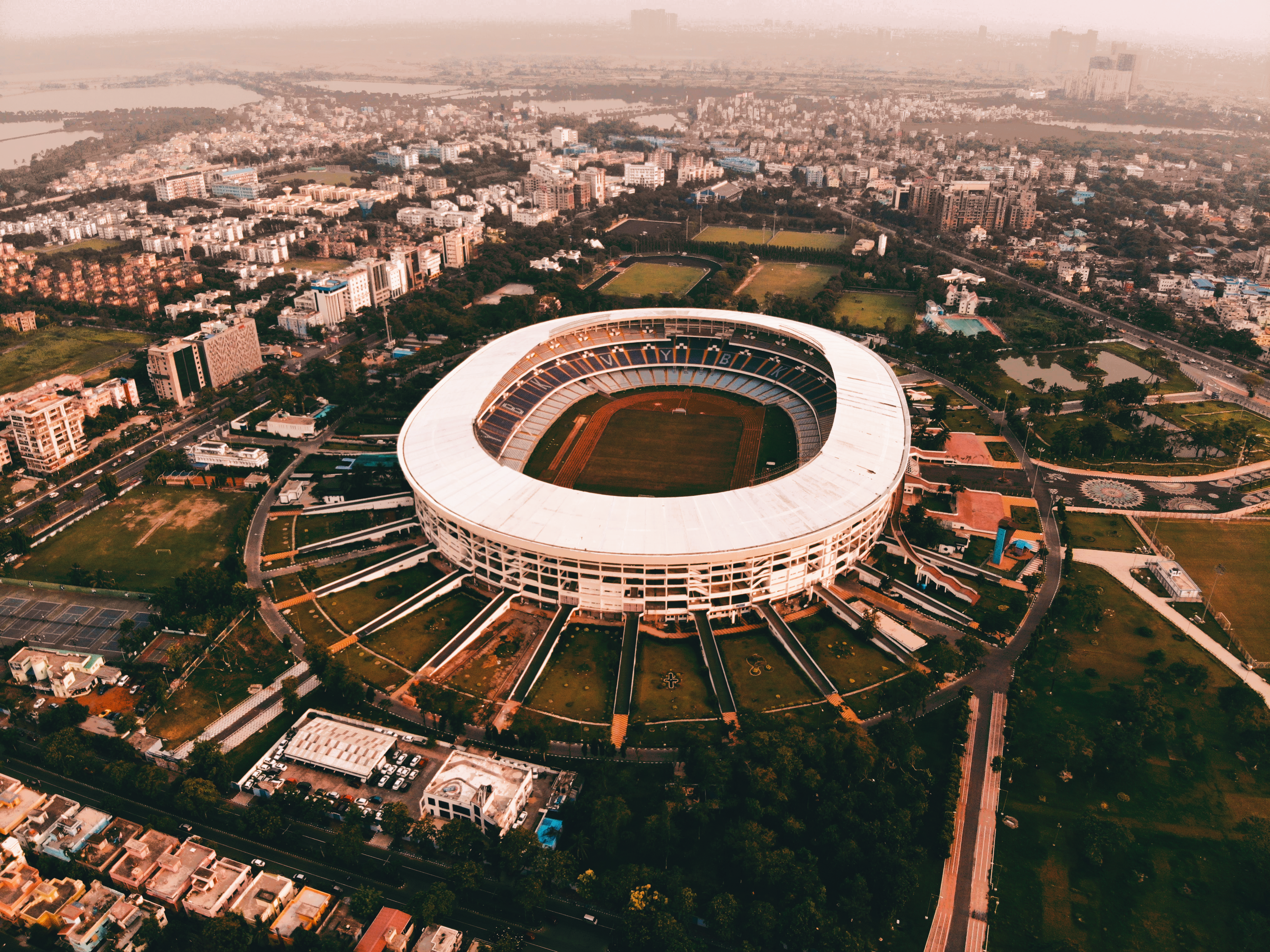
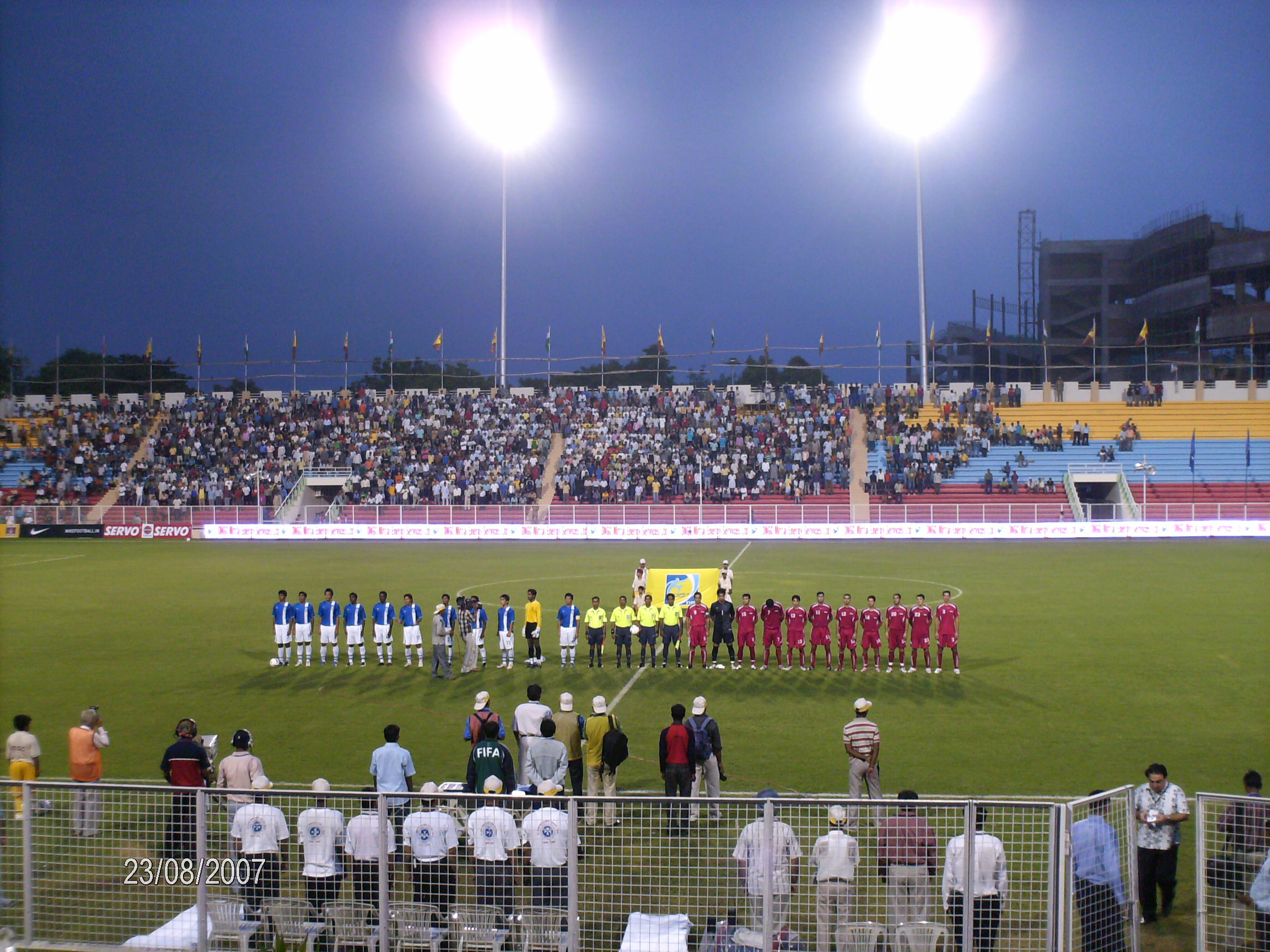
The Salt Lake Stadium in Kolkata (left) and the Ambedkar Stadium in Delhi

Numerous venues around India have hosted home matches for the national team. There is no specific home ground for the India national team. India matches have been played at stadiums such as the Salt Lake Stadium in Kolkata, the Jawaharlal Nehru Stadium in Delhi, the Fatorda Stadium in Margao, the Sree Kanteerava Stadium in Bangalore, the Jawaharlal Nehru Stadium in Kochi, the Mumbai Football Arena in Mumbai, the Indira Gandhi Athletic Stadium in Guwahati, the Khuman Lampak Main Stadium in Imphal, the Kalinga Stadium in Bhubaneswar, the EKA Arena in Ahmedabad and now the Jawaharlal Nehru Stadium in Shillong.

In recent times, competitions like 2011 SAFF Championship and 2012 Nehru Cup were held at Jawaharlal Nehru Stadium in Delhi, the 2015 SAFF Championship at Trivandrum International Stadium, 2017 Hero Tri-Nation Series and 2018 Intercontinental Cup at Mumbai Football Arena and 2019 Intercontinental Cup at the EKA Arena. Indira Gandhi Athletic Stadium, Sree Kanteerava Stadium and Fatorda stadium have seen AFC Asian Cup and FIFA World Cup qualifiers.

=== Supporters ===
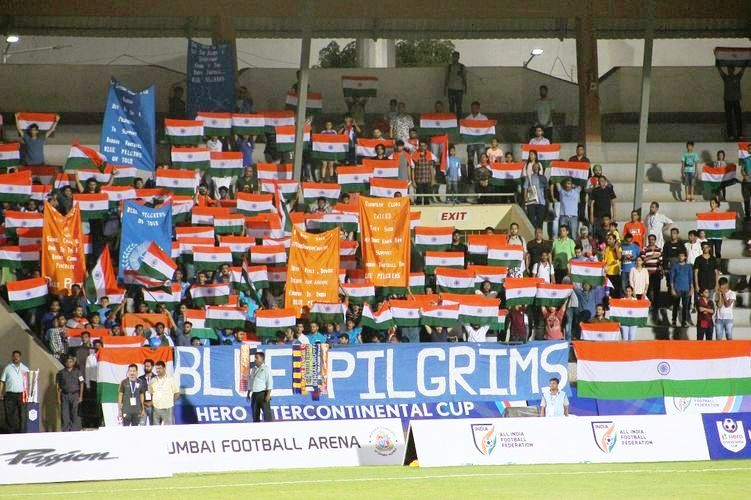
Blue Pilgrims displaying national flag and their own banners at the 2018 Intercontinental Cup

Till the 21st century, the Indian football fans were mostly scattered, being widely based in West Bengal, North-East India, Goa and Kerala. Other than matches in Asian Games, Nehru Cup or SAFF Championship, the crowd showed up in small numbers when the team played as the fans were not organised under any single banner as happens in Europe or South America. Fans of different clubs used to support the team in their respective local venues but were not grouped together to support a single cause, that of the national team, until 2017 when "Blue Pilgrims" was established as the first organised fan club for the national team.

The Blue Pilgrims formed with a motive to support the national team and the U-17 team during the historic 2017 U17 World Cup, India's first ever FIFA competition participation. Started with 300 odd fans, now they are in thousands as a unification of fans from different regions with different allegiances came together for just one cause, the Blue Tigers. They call themselves the devotees of the Blue Tigers, and their motto is to support India national football teams of all gender and age, wherever they play and for such dedication they are called as the 12th man of the team.

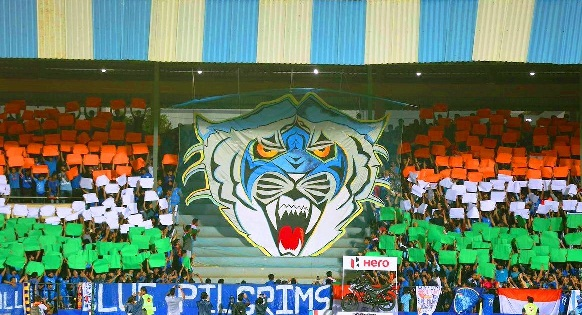
The 3D Blue Tiger tifo displayed by Blue Pilgrims in June 2018

The Blue Pilgrims's most common chants are: "Oh India!", "In unity we stand", "Oh India we stand for you!", "Vande Mataram". Their sports anthems are "Oh when the blues go marching in, I wanna be in that number!" and "Ham honge kamyab" (We shall overcome). Since its formation, the Blue Pilgrims use to celebrate after every match with Viking clap with the national team members. Fans of the India national team display the country's tricolour National flag and also wear blue jerseys in solidarity with the team. They used to display their banner Blue Pilgrims along with "Inquilab-e-Indian football" (Revolution of Indian football) and often shout their common slogan, We love you, wherever you go, we follow!". On 2 June 2018, the then captain Sunil Chhetri posted a video on social media. In his video he urged the fans to come out at Mumbai to support the team after a poor crowd appearance of only 2569 at a match against Chinese Taipei in the 2018 Intercontinental Cup. India achieved a massive victory in that match, winning by 5−0 with Chhetri scoring a hat-trick, but there were very few people present to celebrate. Responding to the captain's call, the Blue Pilgrims and football supporters including the fan clubs like Manjappada, West Block Blues and East Bengal Ultras made sure that the stadiums were full during the next few matches. In the final of that tournament, the Blue Pilgrims displayed a 30 ft (9.1 m) tall 3D tifo of a Blue Tiger, the first ever in the team's history.

=== Media coverage ===
India's competitive international games are covered on television by Star Sports and on its OTT service, Hotstar. Prior to this deal, the AIFF had struck a ten-year deal with Zee Sports in 2006 to broadcast Indian national team's games on its channel with the initiative of 'Goal 2010' . The aim of this whole exercise was to help India qualify for the 2010 World Cup.

== Results and fixtures ==
The following is a list of match results in the last 12 months, as well as any future matches that have been scheduled.

Win Draw Loss Fixture

=== 2026 ===
31 March 2027 ACQ – 3R	India	2–1	Hong Kong	Kochi, India
19:00 UTC+5:30	Williams 4'; Mishra 50'	Report; Report (AFC)	Camargo 65'	Stadium: Jawaharlal Nehru International Stadium; Attendance: 22,690; Referee: Songkran Bunmeekiart (Thailand)

27 May 2026 Unity Cup	India	0–2	Jamaica	London, England
19:30 UTC+1		Report	Clarke 8'; Dixon 78'	Stadium: The Valley; Referee: Darren England (England)

30 May 2026 Unity Cup	Zimbabwe	1–0	India	London, England
14:30 UTC+1	Dube 34' (pen.)	Report		Stadium: The Valley; Referee: Andrew Madley (England)

5 June Friendly	Tajikistan	3–1	India	Tursunzoda, Tajikistan
20:00 UTC+5	Boboev 9' (pen.); Karimov 62'; Panjshanbe 68'	Report	Choudhary 89'	Stadium: TALCO Arena; Attendance: 10,245; Referee: Asker Nadjafaliev (Uzbekistan)

9 June Friendly	Tajikistan	1–1	India	Hisor, Tajikistan
20:00 UTC+5	Boboev 85' (pen.)	Report	V. P. Singh 25'	Stadium: Hisor Central Stadium; Attendance: 9,370; Referee: Akhrol Riskulloev (Uzbekistan)

25 September Friendly	India	1–1	Panama	Bengaluru, India
19:30 UTC+5:30	Williams 41'	Report	O. Valencia 68'	Stadium: Sree Kanteerava Stadium; Attendance: 9,039; Referee: Nazmi Nasaruddin (Malaysia)

3 October Friendly	India	0–4	Brazil	Kolkata, India
19:30 UTC+5:30		AIFF; FIFA	Estêvão 28'; Pedro 42'; Lino 58', 90+5'	Stadium: Salt Lake Stadium; Attendance: 51,402; Referee: Ilgiz Tantashev (Uzbekistan)

6 October Friendly	India	1–6	Uruguay	Kolkata, India
19:30 UTC+5:30	Thapa 22'	AIFF; FIFA	Núñez 12' (pen.); Araújo 28', 59'; Zalazar 53'; Sanabria 71'; Aguirre 86'	Stadium: Salt Lake Stadium; Attendance: 37,307; Referee: Rustam Lutfullin (Uzbekistan)

12 November Friendly	New Zealand	5–0	India	Auckland, New Zealand
19:00 UTC+13	Varghese 5' (o.g.); Randall 34', 43'; Wood 57'; Bayliss 75'	AIFF; NZF		Stadium: Go Media Stadium; Attendance: 10,379; Referee: Adam Kersey (Australia)

15 November Friendly	New Zealand	3–0	India	Christchurch, New Zealand
16:30 UTC+13	Surman 22'; McGarry 40'; Wood 44'	AIFF; NZF		Stadium: One New Zealand Stadium; Referee: Tim Danaskos (Australia)

== Coaching staff ==
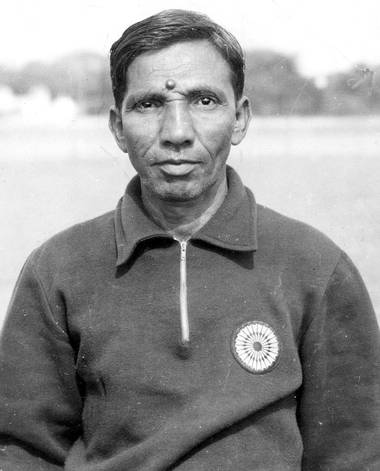
Syed Abdul Rahim, the most successful Indian coach for the national team

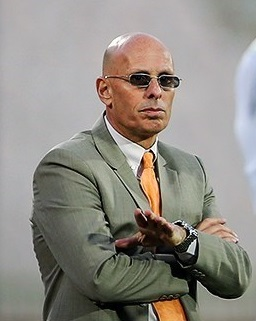
Stephen Constantine in 2019, one of the most successful foreign coaches for the national team

=== Coaching history ===
Since India's independence, there have been twenty-nine different head coaches for the national team, out of which eleven foreign. The most successful head coach for India was Syed Abdul Rahim, who led India to gold in both the 1951 and 1962 Asian Games while also achieving a fourth-place finish during the 1956 Summer Olympics. The most successful foreign head coaches for India were Bob Houghton and Stephen Constantine; both of them helped the team to qualify for the AFC Asian Cup. With Houghton in charge from 2006 to 2011, India won the Nehru Cup twice and the AFC Challenge Cup in 2008, which allowed them to participate in their first AFC Asian Cup for 27 years. Since Houghton resigned as head coach in 2011, the Indian national team's FIFA ranking touched its lowest at 173 in the team history in March 2015, but Constantine, who was appointed for the second time as the head coach of India, revived the Indian team from its meagre condition. Under him, the team remained unbeaten for two years from June 2016 to March 2018 winning 11 matches and drawn 2 matches, which helped them to qualify for 2019 AFC Asian Cup, 8 years since Houghton left. He also helped the team to reach a better FIFA ranking of 96 in July 2017, which was the best in last 21 years.

=== Present coaching staff ===
As of 17 August 2025

Position	Name	Ref.
Head coach	(India) Khalid Jamil	
Assistant coach	(India) Mahesh Gawli (India) Renedy Singh (India) T. G. Purushothaman	
Goalkeeping coach	(India) Feroz Sherif	
Strength & conditioning coach	(India) Chelston Pinto	
Analyst	(India) Vignesh P. G.	
Physiotherapists	(India) Sudarson Raju (India) Pradeep Ramalingam	
Team director	(India) Subrata Paul	

== Players ==
=== Current squad ===
The following players were named in the squad for the two friendlies against New Zealand on 12 November and 15 November respectively.

Caps and goals are correct as of 6 October 2026, after the match against Uruguay.

No.	Pos.	Player	Date of birth (age)	Caps	Goals	Club
	GK	Vishal Kaith	22 July 1996 (age 30)	8	0	(All India Football Federation) Mohun Bagan
	GK	Hrithik Tiwari	10 January 2002 (age 24)	0	0	(All India Football Federation) Goa
	GK	Som Kumar	27 February 2005 (age 21)	0	0	(Football Association of Slovenia) Slovan
	DF	Abhishek Singh Tekcham	2 January 2005 (age 21)	7	0	(All India Football Federation) Mohun Bagan
	DF	Akash Mishra	27 November 2001 (age 24)	37	1	(All India Football Federation) Mumbai City
	DF	Bijoy Varghese	14 March 2000 (age 26)	6	0	(All India Football Federation) Punjab
	DF	Roshan Singh Naorem	2 February 1999 (age 27)	19	0	(All India Football Federation) Bengaluru
	DF	Jay Gupta	27 September 2001 (age 25)	5	0	(All India Football Federation) East Bengal
	DF	Pramveer Singh	20 June 2007 (age 19)	5	0	(All India Football Federation) Punjab
	DF	Mehtab Singh	5 June 1998 (age 28)	12	0	(All India Football Federation) Mohun Bagan
	DF	Ricky Meetei Haobam	30 August 2006 (age 20)	0	0	(All India Football Federation) Bengaluru
	MF	Anirudh Thapa	15 January 1998 (age 28)	62	5	(All India Football Federation) Mohun Bagan
	MF	Ashique Kuruniyan	14 June 1997 (age 29)	45	2	(All India Football Federation) Bengaluru
	MF	Lalremtluanga Fanai	10 July 2002 (age 24)	1	0	(All India Football Federation) Bengaluru
	MF	Jithin M. S.	16 January 1998 (age 28)	4	0	(All India Football Federation) NorthEast United
	MF	Lalrinliana Hnamte	29 April 2003 (age 23)	1	0	(All India Football Federation) SC Delhi
	MF	Tomba Singh Haobam	1 February 2004 (age 22)	0	0	(All India Football Federation) Goa
	MF	Mohammed Sanan	13 October 2003 (age 23)	7	0	(All India Football Federation) Kerala Blasters
	FW	Manvir Singh	7 November 1995 (age 31)	52	7	(All India Football Federation) Mohun Bagan
	FW	Liston Colaco	12 November 1998 (age 28)	34	1	(All India Football Federation) Mohun Bagan
	FW	Ryan Williams	28 October 1993 (age 33)	5	2	(All India Football Federation) Bengaluru
	FW	David Lalhlansanga	27 November 2001 (age 24)	0	0	(All India Football Federation) East Bengal
	FW	Muhammad Suhail	12 September 2006 (age 20)	0	0	(All India Football Federation) Punjab

=== Recent callups ===
The following footballers were part of national selection in the past twelve months, but are not part of the current squad.

Pos.	Player	Date of birth (age)	Caps	Goals	Club	Latest call-up
GK	Gurpreet Singh Sandhu (captain)	3 February 1992 (age 34)	91	0	(India) Bengaluru	vs Uruguay, October 2026
GK	Albino Gomes	7 February 1994 (age 32)	2	0	(India) Inter Kashi	vs Uruguay, October 2026
GK	Prabhsukhan Singh Gill	2 January 2001 (age 25)	1	0	(India) East Bengal	vs Uruguay, October 2026
DF	Anwar Ali	28 August 2000 (age 26)	38	2	(India) East Bengal	vs Uruguay, October 2026^{INJ}
DF	Hmingthanmawia Ralte	31 May 2000 (age 26)	8	0	(India) Mumbai City	vs Uruguay, October 2026
DF	Sandesh Jhingan	21 July 1993 (age 33)	76	6	(India) Goa	vs Tajikistan, June 2026
DF	Rahul Bheke	6 December 1990 (age 35)	50	3	(India) Bengaluru	vs Tajikistan, June 2026
DF	Nikhil Poojary	3 September 1995 (age 31)	33	1	(India) Bengaluru	vs Tajikistan, June 2026
DF	Nikhil Barla	5 August 2003 (age 23)	3	0	(India) NorthEast United	vs Tajikistan, June 2026
MF	Farukh Choudhary	8 November 1996 (age 30)	25	3	(India) Chennaiyin	vs Uruguay, October 2026
MF	Lalengmawia Ralte	17 October 2000 (age 26)	31	0	(India) Mohun Bagan	vs Uruguay, October 2026
MF	Macarton Nickson	19 March 2004 (age 22)	6	0	(India) NorthEast United	vs Uruguay, October 2026
MF	Ricky Shabong	29 December 2002 (age 23)	6	0	(India) Punjab	vs Uruguay, October 2026
MF	Sahal Abdul Samad	1 April 1997 (age 29)	45	3	(India) Mohun Bagan	vs Uruguay, October 2026
MF	Jeakson Singh Thounaojam	21 June 2001 (age 25)	32	0	(India) East Bengal	vs Tajikistan, June 2026
MF	Noufal PN	30 October 2000 (age 26)	1	0	(India) Mumbai City	vs Tajikistan, June 2026
MF	Danish Farooq Bhat	9 May 1995 (age 31)	6	0	(India) East Bengal	vs Hong Kong, March 2026
FW	Edmund Lalrindika	24 April 1999 (age 27)	13	0	(India) East Bengal	vs New Zealand, November 2026^{INJ}
FW	Irfan Yadwad	19 June 2001 (age 25)	7	0	(India) Chennaiyin	vs Uruguay, October 2026
FW	Rahim Ali	21 April 2000 (age 26)	22	1	(India) Odisha	vs Uruguay, October 2026
FW	Vikram Partap Singh	16 January 2002 (age 24)	16	1	(India) Mumbai City	vs Uruguay, October 2026
FW	Lallianzuala Chhangte	8 June 1997 (age 29)	55	9	(India) Mohun Bagan	vs Tajikistan, June 2026
FW	Parthib Gogoi	30 January 2003 (age 23)	1	0	(India) NorthEast United	vs Tajikistan, June 2026
FW	Suhail Ahmad Bhat	8 April 2005 (age 21)	5	4	(India) Mohun Bagan	2026 SAFF Championship
^{INJ} Withdrew due to injury; ^{PRE} Preliminary squad / standby; ^{RET} Retired from the national team; ^{WD} Player withdrew from squad due to non-injury issue

=== Notable players ===
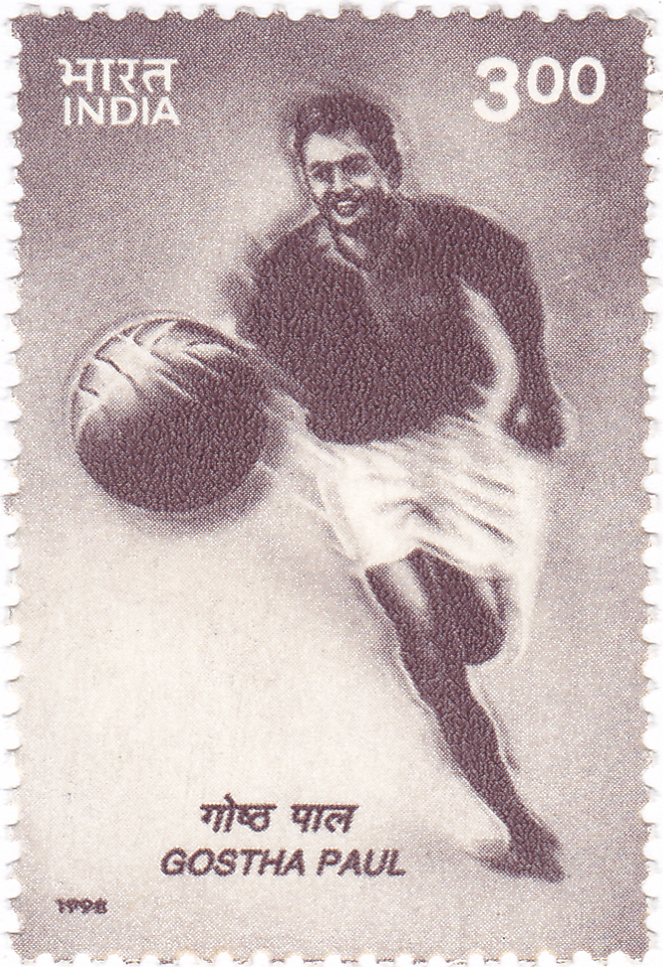
Postage stamp issued in 1998, to honour Gostha Pal

During the early 20th century, India produced one of the best footballers from Asia at that time, Gostha Pal. Pal began playing professional football at the age of 16 in 1911, becoming India's first captain, and was considered one of the best defenders India had ever produced. He was also the first footballer to be awarded Padma Shree in the year 1962, and in 1998, the Government of India introduced a postal stamp in his honour. In the later 1930s, players like R. Lumsden, Noor Mohammed, T. Rahim, K. Prosad, A. Nandi under the leadership of Karuna Bhattacharya played for India who scored a total of 56 goals in 17 matches during the 1938 Australia tour out of which 5 matches were against Australia, where Lumsden scored the first international hat-trick for India.

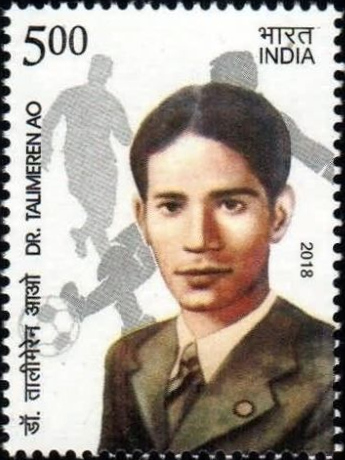
Postage stamp issued in 2018, to honour Talimeren Ao

India's first captain after the country gained independence was Dr. Talimeren Ao. At a very young age, using footballs made out of rags, Ao gradually improved his skills as a defensive midfielder. He was given the responsibility of leading the team at the 1948 Olympics, India's first major tournament and also was the flag bearer of Indian contingents in London. Also during this era, India produced Sailen Manna, one of the country's best defenders. He was given the India captaincy in 1951 during the Asian Games, led the team to the gold medal, India's first major international honour, and also captained the team during the 1952 Olympics and 1954 Asian Games. In 1953, England Football Association rated Manna among "10 Best Skippers of the World" in its yearbook, the Government of India awarded him Padma Shri in 1971 and AIFF honoured him as "AIFF Player-of-the-Millennium" in 2000.

During India's golden era between the 1950s and early 60s, the country produced coveted strikers such as Sheoo Mewalal, Neville D'Souza, Chuni Goswami, Inder Singh and Tulsidas Balaram. Mewalal was India's starting striker during the 1948 Olympics, 1952 Olympics and 1951 Asian games where he ended as the tournament top goalscorer with four goals. Mewalal was the first Indian player to score a hat-trick since the country gained independence when he scored it against Burma during the 1952 Asian Quadrangular Football Tournament. D'Souza meanwhile became the first Asian player to score a hat-trick at the Olympic Games, scoring a hat-trick against Australia during the 1956 Olympics. D'Souza also tied for top goalscorer in that edition of the Olympics, which helped India reach the semi-finals. Goswami represented India at the 1958 Asian Games and the 1960 Olympics, and captained the side during the 1962 Asian Games and the 1964 Asian Cup. He was bestowed with Padma Shri by the Government of India and AFC honoured him as "Best Striker of Asia" in 1962.

P. K. Banerjee, a winger who represented India at the 1956 Olympics and later captained the side during the 1960 Olympics, was named as the best "Indian player of the 20th Century". Peter Thangaraj was the starting goalkeeper for India during the later stage of India's golden era, being named as best "Indian keeper of the 20th Century" by IFFHS. P. K. Banerjee was honoured with Padma Shri by Government of India in 1990, and in 2004 FIFA bestowed him with "FIFA Centennial Order of Merit" Award, the highest honour awarded by FIFA.

From the 1970s to the 2000s, India saw a decline in their results. Despite the lack of tournament victories, the country managed to produce players like Syed Nayeemuddin who led India to bronze at the 1970 Asian Games. During the 1990s, I. M. Vijayan, India's best player at the time, was capped 72 times for India while scoring 29 goals and captaining the team several times.

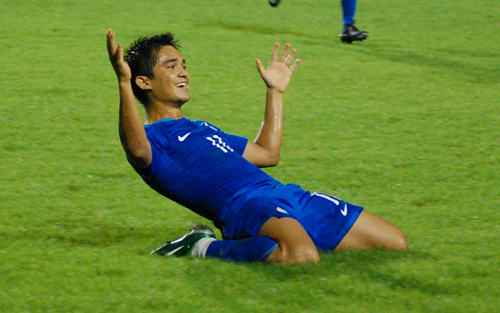
Sunil Chhetri celebrating after scoring a goal

In 1995, Bhaichung Bhutia debuted for India. With Bhutia, India qualified for the AFC Asian Cup after a drought of 27 years. He was the captain of the team for over ten years. Considered one of the greatest footballers of India, he is the second-most-capped player of India with 84 caps and scored 27 times for India. He was awarded the Padma Shri in 2008 and IFFHS listed him among the legendary players of football in 2016. Under Bhutia's captaincy Sunil Chhetri debuted for India who is now the only footballer in India's history to have played 100 international matches and is the all-time highest goal-scorer of India. Chhetri led the national team to many victories, most importantly qualifying for the AFC Asian Cup and under his leadership the team achieved its highest FIFA ranking of 96 after twenty-one years. His goal-scoring ability and skills made him the only Indian striker to score four hat-tricks for India. Sunil Chhetri is now the fourth-highest international goalscorer overall, behind only Cristiano Ronaldo, Lionel Messi and Ali Daei,and is also the most-capped player and the all-time top goalscorer of the India national team.

== Competitive record ==
=== FIFA World Cup ===
India has never played in the finals of the FIFA World Cup. After gaining independence in 1947, India managed to qualify for the World Cup held in 1950. This was due to Myanmar, Indonesia, and the Philippines withdrawing from qualification round. However, prior to the start of the tournament, India themselves withdrew due to the expenses required in getting the team to Brazil. But this reason was untrue because FIFA was ready to give money to India (AIFF) for their trip to Brazil. Other reasons cited for why India withdrew include FIFA not allowing Indian players to play in the tournament barefoot and the All India Football Federation not considering the FIFA World Cup an important tournament compared to the Olympics. According to some pundits the barefoot story was manufactured by AIFF to stop people questioning why India did not participate in the tournament. The AIFF reportedly lacked confidence in the players’ abilities to perform in the tournament.

After withdrawing from the 1950 FIFA World Cup, India did not enter the qualifying rounds of the tournament between 1954 and 1982. Since the 1986 qualifiers, with the exception of the 1990 edition of the tournament, the team has participated in World Cup qualification, but has yet to qualify for the finals.

FIFA World Cup record										FIFA World Cup qualification record						
Year	Result	Position	Pld	W	D	L	GF	GA	Squad	Pld	W	D	L	GF	GA	Ref.
(Uruguay) 1930 to (France) 1938	Did not enter									Did not enter						–
(Brazil) 1950	Qualified, but withdrew									Qualified by default						
(Switzerland) 1954	Denied by FIFA									Denied by FIFA						
(Sweden) 1958 to (Spain) 1982	Did not enter									Did not enter						–
(Mexico) 1986	Did not qualify									6	2	3	1	7	6	
(Italy) 1990	Did not qualify									Withdrew from qualification						–
(United States) 1994	Did not qualify									8	1	1	6	8	22	
(France) 1998	Did not qualify									3	1	1	1	3	7	
(South Korea) (Japan) 2002	Did not qualify									6	3	2	1	11	5	
(Germany) 2006	Did not qualify									6	1	1	4	2	18	
(South Africa) 2010	Did not qualify									2	0	1	1	3	6	
(Brazil) 2014	Did not qualify									2	0	1	1	2	5	
(Russia) 2018	Did not qualify									10	2	1	7	7	18	
(Qatar) 2022	Did not qualify									8	1	4	3	6	7	
(Canada) (Mexico) (United States) 2026	Did not qualify									6	1	2	3	3	7	–
(Morocco) (Portugal) (Spain) 2030	To be determined									To be determined						
(Saudi Arabia) 2034	To be determined									To be determined						
Total	—	0/11	0	0	0	0	0	0	—	57	12	17	28	52	101	—

=== AFC Asian Cup ===
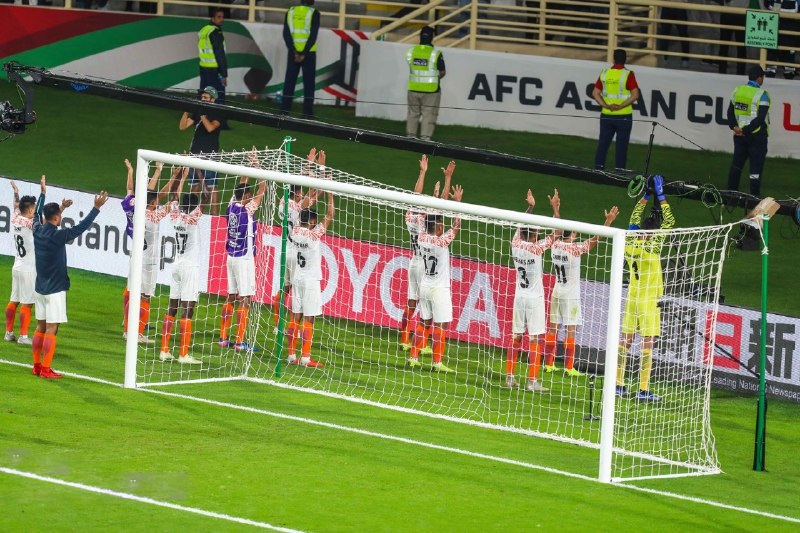
Indian players celebrating with fans after winning a match at 2019 AFC Asian Cup

India has qualified for the AFC Asian Cup five times. The team played their first Asian Cup in 1964. The team managed to qualify following other nations' refusal to play against India due to political reasons. India managed to finish the tournament as runners-up to hosts Israel, with Inder Singh finishing as joint top-scorer.

Since then, India has failed to progress beyond the first round of the Asian Cup, exiting at the group stage in the 1984, 2011 and 2019 editions and most recently the 2023 Asian Cup.

Following the 2019 edition, India qualified for the 2023 Asian Cup after winning all of their matches in the third round of 2023 AFC Asian Cup qualification. This marked the first time India had ever qualified for consecutive editions of the continental championship. However, India missed out on the next edition after failing to advance past the third round of the 2027 AFC Asian Cup qualification.

AFC Asian Cup record										Qualification record						
Year	Result	Position	Pld	W	D	L	GF	GA	Squad	Pld	W	D	L	GF	GA	Ref.
(Hong Kong) 1956	Did not enter									Did not enter						–
(South Korea) 1960	Did not qualify									6	2	0	4	7	9	
(Israel) 1964	Runners-up	2nd	3	2	0	1	5	3	Squad	Qualified by default						
(Iran) 1968	Did not qualify									3	0	1	2	2	6	
(Thailand) 1972	Did not enter									Did not enter						–
(Iran) 1976	Did not enter									Did not enter						–
(Kuwait) 1980	Did not enter									Did not enter						–
(Singapore) 1984	Group stage	10th	4	0	1	3	0	7	Squad	4	3	0	1	8	2	
(Qatar) 1988	Did not qualify									5	0	1	4	0	6	
(Japan) 1992	Did not qualify									2	1	0	1	2	3	
(United Arab Emirates) 1996	Did not qualify									2	0	0	2	3	12	
(Lebanon) 2000	Did not qualify									4	1	1	2	8	9	
(China) 2004	Did not qualify									2	0	1	1	1	3	
(Indonesia) (Malaysia) (Thailand) (Vietnam) 2007	Did not qualify									6	0	0	6	2	24	
(Qatar) 2011	Group stage	16th	3	0	0	3	3	13	Squad	2008 AFC Challenge Cup winners						
(Australia) 2015	Did not qualify									Failed to win 2012 & did not qualify for 2014 AFC Challenge Cup						
(United Arab Emirates) 2019	Group stage	17th	3	1	0	2	4	4	Squad	18	8	2	8	25	24	
(Qatar) 2023	Group stage	24th	3	0	0	3	0	6	Squad	11	4	4	3	14	8	
(Saudi Arabia) 2027	Did not qualify									12	2	4	6	7	13	–
Total	Runners-up	2nd	16	3	1	12	12	33	—	75	21	15	39	80	119	—

=== Summer Olympics ===
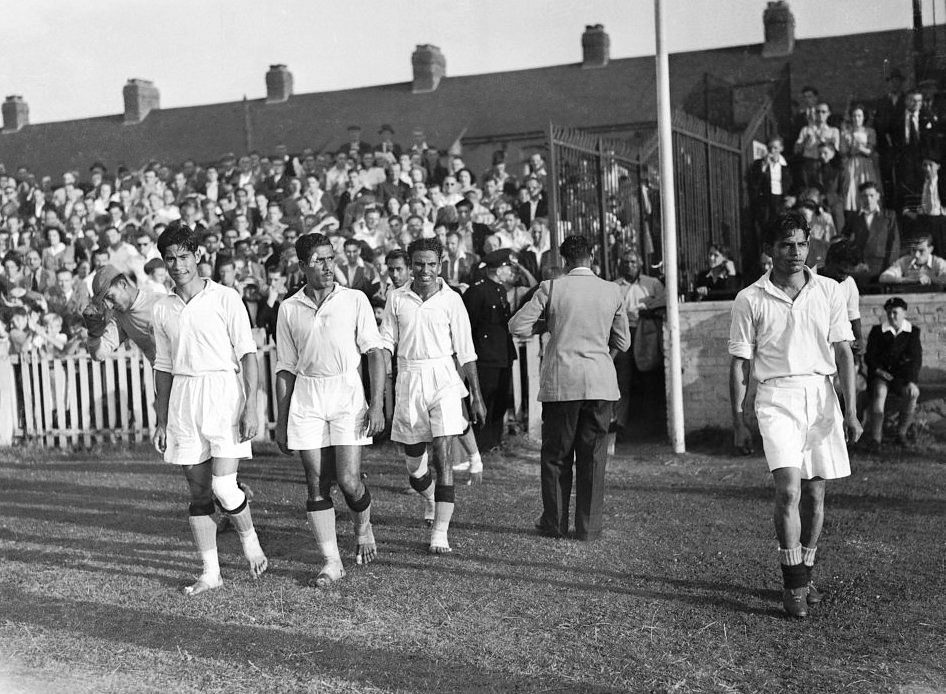
Talimeren Ao on the left, leading the Indian team to Cricklefield Stadium to play against France in 1948

India competed in four straight Olympic football tournaments between 1948 and 1960. Their sole 1948 Olympics match against France was also India's first ever international match since the country gained independence in 1947. During the match, a majority of the Indian side played barefoot. The match ended in a 2–1 defeat, with Sarangapani Raman scoring the lone goal for India. India then returned to the Olympics four years later where they took on Yugoslavia in the preliminary rounds. The team suffered a 10–1 defeat, India's largest margin of defeat in a competitive match, and were knocked out.

Four years later, during the 1956 Olympics, India managed to reach the semi-finals and finish fourth. After India's first round opponents, Hungary, withdrew from the tournament, the team played against hosts Australia in the quarter-finals. A Neville D'Souza hat-trick, the first by an Asian footballer in the Olympics, helped India win 4–2. However, in the semi-finals, India once again suffered defeat against Yugoslavia, going down 4–1. In the bronze medal match, India were defeated 3–0 by Bulgaria.

In 1960, India competed in Group D with Hungary, France and Peru. India ended the group in last place, drawing once. India have since failed to qualify for another Olympic games.

Summer Olympics record										Summer Olympics qualification record						
Host/Year	Result	Position	Pld	W	D	L	GF	GA	Squad	Pld	W	D	L	GF	GA	Ref.
(United Kingdom) 1908 to (Germany) 1936	Did not enter									Did not enter						–
(United Kingdom) 1948	Round 1	11th	1	0	0	1	1	2	Squad	Qualified automatically						
(Finland) 1952	Preliminaries	25th	1	0	0	1	1	10	Squad	Qualified automatically						
(Australia) 1956	Semi-finals	4th	3	1	0	2	5	9	Squad	Bye						
(Italy) 1960	Round 1	13th	3	0	1	2	3	6	Squad	3	3	0	0	11	4	
(Japan) 1964 to (South Korea) 1988	Did not qualify									20	6	1	13	34	38	–
(Spain) 1992–present	See India national U-23 team									See India national U-23 team						
Total	Semi-finals	4th	8	1	1	6	10	27	—	23	9	1	13	45	42	–

=== Asian Games ===
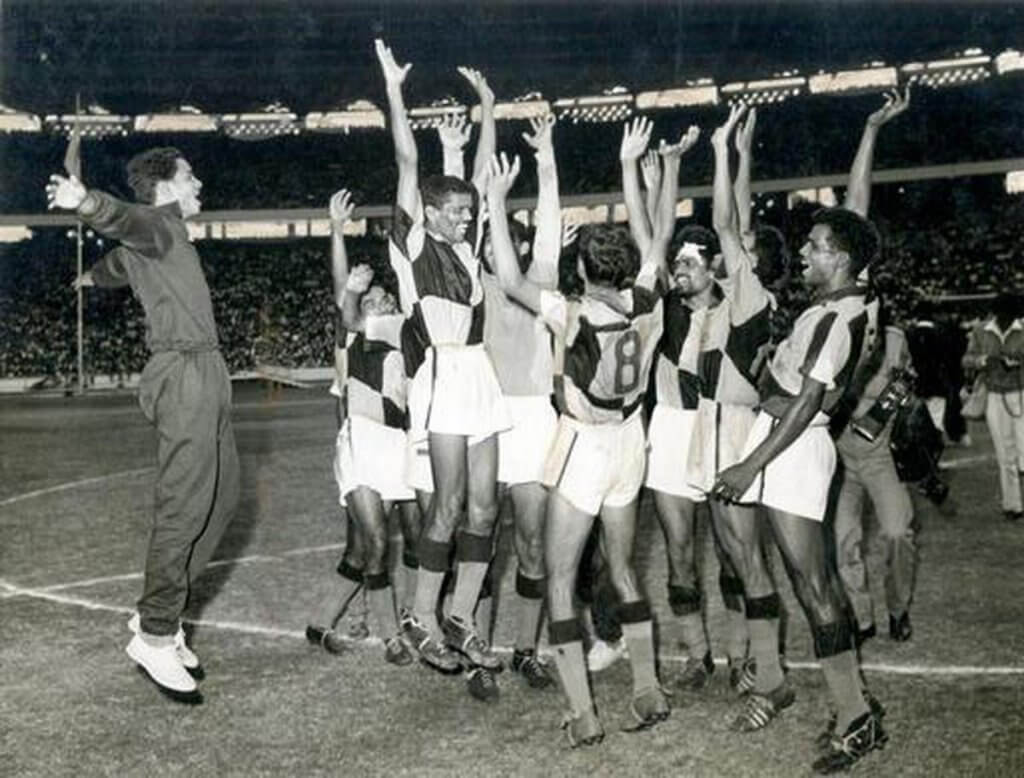
Indian team celebrating after defeating South Korea in the final of 1962 Asiad at Senayan Main Stadium, Jakarta

India competed in eleven Asian Games, starting from 1951 to 1998, except the 1990 and 1994 editions. In 1951 Asian Games India won their first match against Indonesia in the first round and then defeated Japan in semi-final and went on to win against Iran in the final in front of the home crowd. The achievement of the Indian team was a special one as they became the first ever Asian Games gold medalists in football and also the first ever Asian football champions as well.

Though the next two tournaments proved to be less successful for the team, but they bounced back by winning the gold at the 1962 Asian games by defeating the Asian Cup winners South Korea in the final to win their second continental title. The team failed to defend their title in 1966 and went on to claim the bronze medal in 1970.

This was the last time India ever finished on the medal podium, the next years proved to be hard for the Indian team to regain their dominance as the side went through a sharp decline. After two disappointing editions in 1974 and 1978, India performed much better in the 1982 Asiad, which they hosted for the second time by reaching the quarter-finals but lost to Saudi Arabia. After the poor performance in 1986 Asian Games the national team did not attend the 1990 and 1994 games. The team made their return in 1998.

Asian Games record
Host/Year	Result	Position	Pld	W	D	L	GF	GA	Squad	Ref.
(India) 1951	Champions	1st	3	3	0	0	7	0	Squad	
(Philippines) 1954	Round 1	8th	2	1	0	1	3	6	Squad	
(Japan) 1958	Semi-finals	4th	5	2	0	3	12	13	Squad	
(Indonesia) 1962	Champions	1st	5	4	0	1	11	6	Squad	
(Thailand) 1966	Round 1	8th	3	1	0	2	4	7	Squad	
(Thailand) 1970	Third Place	3rd	6	3	1	2	8	5	Squad	
(Iran) 1974	Round 1	13th	3	0	0	3	2	14	Squad	
(Thailand) 1978	Round 2	8th	5	1	0	4	5	13	Squad	
(India) 1982	Quarter-finals	6th	4	2	1	1	5	3	Squad	
(South Korea) 1986	Round 1	16th	3	0	0	3	1	8	Squad	
(China) 1990	Withdrew									
(Japan) 1994	Indian Olympic Association did not allow team's participation									
(Thailand) 1998	Round 2	16th	5	1	0	4	3	8	Squad	
(South Korea) 2002–present	See India national U-23 team									
Total	2 Titles	1st	44	18	2	24	61	83	—	—

== Honours ==
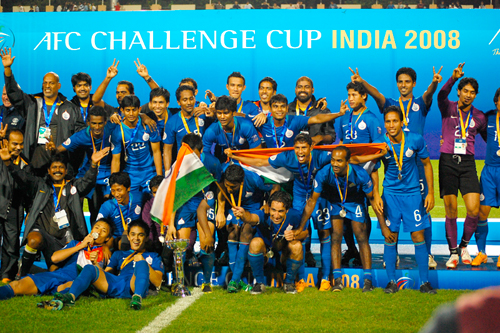
Indian team celebrating their 2008 AFC Challenge Cup victory against Tajikistan

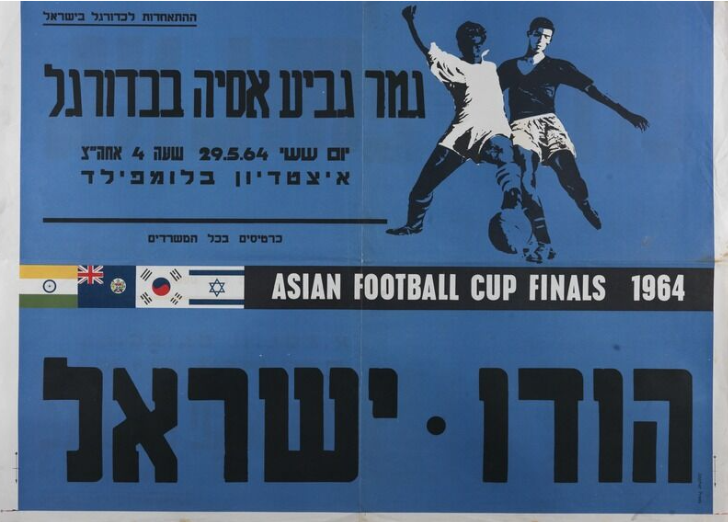
A poster advertising India vs Israel at 1964 Asian Cup

Following are the achievements of the team in various continental and regional tournaments.

=== Continental ===
- AFC Asian Cup
  - (silver) Runners-up (1): 1964
- AFC Challenge Cup
  - (gold) Champions (1): 2008
- Asian Games
  - (gold) Gold medal (2): 1951, 1962
  - (bronze) Bronze medal (1): 1970

=== Regional ===
- SAFF Championship
  - (gold) Champions (8): 1993, 1997, 1999, 2005, 2011, 2015, 2021, 2023
  - (silver) Runners-up (4): 1995, 2008, 2013, 2018
  - (bronze) Third place (1): 2003
- South Asian Games
  - (gold) Gold medal (3): 1985, 1987, 1995
  - (silver) Silver medal (1): 1993
  - (bronze) Bronze medal (2): 1989, 1999
- CAFA Nations Cup
  - (bronze) Third place (1): 2025

== See also ==
- Football in India
- Women's football in India
- India women's national football team
- India national futsal team
- India women's national futsal team
- India national beach soccer team
- Football at the Asian Games
- Football at the Summer Olympics
- List of India national football team hat-tricks
- List of India national football team captains
- AIFF Player of the Year Awards
- FPAI Indian Player of the Year

Awards and achievements
Preceded by Inaugural champions	Asian Games Champions; 1951 (first title)	Succeeded by 1954 Taiwan
Preceded by 1958 Taiwan	Asian Games Champions; 1962 (second title)	Succeeded by 1966 Burma
Preceded by 2006 Tajikistan	AFC Challenge Cup Champions; 2008 (first title)	Succeeded by 2010 North Korea
