= Mohammad Irfan (disambiguation) =

Mohammad Irfan (born 1982) is a Pakistani international cricketer.

Mohammad Irfan or Muhammad Irfan may also refer to:

- Mohammad Irfan (cricketer, born August 1989), Pakistani first-class cricketer
- Mohammad Irfan (cricketer, born October 1989), Pakistani first-class cricketer
- Mohammad Irfan (cricketer, born 1995), Pakistani first-class cricketer
- Muhammad Irfan (field hockey) (born 1990), Pakistani field hockey player
- Muhammad Irfan (footballer) (born 1984), Pakistani footballer
- Mohammad Irfan (politician) (1951–2016), Indian politician
- Mohammed Irfan (singer), Indian singer
- Mohammed Irfan, a Pakistani detainee at Guantanamo Bay (ISN 00101)
- Irfan Khan (Pakistani cricketer) (born 2002), Pakistani cricketer

== See also ==
- Mohammed Irfan Afridi (born 1985), Ugandan cricketer
