= Muli (Meemu Atoll) =

Muli މުލި
- Inhabited island
- Location in Maldives
- Coordinates: 2°55′18.84″N 73°34′52.9″E
- Country: Maldives
- Administrative atoll: Meemu Atoll
- Distance to Malé: 138.83 km (86.26 mi)

Dimensions
  - Length: 1.525 km (0.948 mi)
  - Width: 0.600 km (0.373 mi)

Population (2022)
  - Total: 949
- Time zone: UTC+05:00 (MST)

Muli (Dhivehi: މުލި) is the capital of Meemu Atoll, which is an administrative division of the Maldives.

== History ==
Muli was one of the ten Maldivian islands worst affected by the 2004 Indian Ocean earthquake and tsunami.

== Geography ==
The island is 138.83 km (86 mi; 75 nmi) south of the country's capital, Malé. The land area of the island was described as being 37.4 ha (92 acres) in 2018. However, in 2017, a land reclamation scheme was completed, which increased the land area by 40 ha (99 acres), but which may not be reflected by the latter-dated figure.

== Demography ==
Historical population
Year	Pop.	±%
2006	746	—
2021	1,013	+35.8%
2022	949	−6.3%
2006-2014-2022: Census populations Source:

== Healthcare ==
Muli has a pharmacy.It has a Regional Hospital with specialist like Gynecologist, Peadiatrician, General Surgeon, Aneasthetist and General Medical officers, Dental officer, Physical Therapist. Other facilities like X-ray, Laboratory services also available.
