= Thomas Flath =

German football player and manager

Personal information
- Date of birth: 13 November 1964 (age 61)
- Place of birth: Düsseldorf, West Germany
- Position: Midfielder

Team information
- Current team: Borussia Mönchengladbach U17 (Manager)

Youth career
- 1979–1983: Fortuna Düsseldorf

Senior career*
Years	Team	Apps	(Gls)
1983–1984	Fortuna Düsseldorf II		

Managerial career
- 1992–1994: Fortuna Düsseldorf B-Youth
- 1995–2002: Fortuna Düsseldorf A Youth
- 2002–2003: Schalke 04 Youth
- 1995–2009: DFB (Abroad Specialist)
- 2004: AFC (Technical Director Grassroots & Youth Development)
- 2004–2007: DFB (Head Scout)
- 2007: SAFA (Head Coach Instructor)
- 2008: Azerbaijan (Technical Director)
- 2008: Nepal
- 2009–2010: Hannover 96 II
- 2010–: Borussia Mönchengladbach U17
- * Club domestic league appearances and goals

Thomas Flath (born 13 November 1964) is a German football player and manager, who is head coach of Borussia Mönchengladbach U17.

== Playing career ==
Flath was born in Düsseldorf. A Fortuna Düsseldorf youth product he retired in 1984 at the age of 20 after one season with the club's reserves. He played as a midfielder.

== Coaching career ==
Flath began his coaching career as youth coach for Fortuna Düsseldorf and coach later the youth team from FC Schalke 04, later was Technical Director of the Asian Football Confederation. Flath was on 28 April 2008 named as the head coach of Nepal national football team and coached the team between 30 June 2008. On 6 October 2009, was named as the new head coach of Hannover 96 II, replacing Andreas Bergmann who became the head coach of the Bundesliga team from Hannover 96.
