= Mohamed Nihan Nasir =

Maldivian footballer

Nihan Nasir
Personal information
- Full name: Mohamed Nihan Nasir
- Date of birth: 16 April 1981 (age 45)
- Place of birth: Maldives
- Position: Striker

Youth career
- Malé English School

Senior career*
Years	Team	Apps	(Gls)
- New Radiant
- Club Eagles
- New Radiant

International career
- Maldives

Managerial career
- 2002: Muli Zuvaanunge Jamiyya
- * Club domestic league appearances and goals

Mohamed Nihan Nasir (born 16 April 1981) is a retired Maldivian international footballer. He was a member of the FAM Referees' Committee.

== Club career ==
Nihan was first spotted during his youth years at Malé English School. He spent almost all of his senior career at New Radiant but played a season for Club Eagles.

He spent most of his career, suffering with serious injuries and was forced to retire at the age of 26.

He once coached for Muli Zuvaanunge Jamiyya in Zone 5 Championship, in the year 2002.

== International career ==
Nihan represented Maldives in FIFA World Cup qualification matches.
