= Kinley Wangchuk (footballer) =

Bhutanese footballer

Personal information
- Full name: Kinley Wangchuk
- Date of birth: March 1, 1984 (age 42)
- Place of birth: Paro, Bhutan
- Position: Defender

Senior career*
Years	Team	Apps	(Gls)
2008–2009	Yeedzin		
2010	Druk Star		

International career^{‡}
2009	Bhutan	5	(0)
- * Club domestic league appearances and goals ‡ National team caps and goals as of 8 December 2009

Kinley Wangchuk (born 1 April 1984) is a retired Bhutanese footballer, who last played for Druk Star. He made his first appearance for the Bhutan national football team at the 2009 SAFF Championship in Dhaka, Bangladesh.
