= Muhammad Irfan (footballer) =

Pakistani footballer (born 1984)

Personal information
- Full name: Muhammad Irfan
- Date of birth: 5 June 1984 (age 42)
- Place of birth: Kohat, Pakistan
- Position: Defender

Senior career*
Years	Team	Apps	(Gls)
2003–2018	Pakistan Airlines		

International career
2006	Pakistan U23		
2006–2008	Pakistan	5	(0)
- * Club domestic league appearances and goals

Muhammad Irfan (born 5 June 1984) is a Pakistani former footballer who played as a defender.

== International career ==
Shahid was called up to the Pakistan under 23 national team for the 2006 South Asian Games held in Colombo, where he helped Pakistan win the gold medal.

He earned his first senior international cap against Oman in the 2007 AFC Asian Cup qualifiers. His second international cap came in a 2010 FIFA World Cup qualifying match against Iraq on 28 October 2007 in which the team held the then Asian Champions to a goalless draw.

== Career statistics ==
=== International ===
Appearances and goals by year and competition
National team	Year	Apps	Goals
Pakistan	2006	1	0
Pakistan	2007	1	0
Pakistan	2008	3	0
Total		5	0

== Honours ==
=== Pakistan U-23 ===
- South Asian Games: 2006
