= Klaus Stärk =

German football manager

Personal information
- Full name: Klaus Stärk
- Date of birth: 1954 (age 71–72)
- Place of birth: Germany

Managerial career
- Years: Team
- 2005-June 2008: Afghanistan

Klaus Stärk (born 1954) is a football coach from Germany.

== Coaching career ==
He went to Afghanistan from the German Football Association in 2004 in order to develop the national team. Stärk was in charge of coaching the Afghanistan national team from 2005 and also coached women footballers in the country.

Under him, the national team saw improvements and qualified for the 2008 AFC Challenge Cup ahead of favourites Kyrgyzstan.

After he could not qualify the national team for the ASEAN Football Championship, he resigned.
