= Sangay Khandu =

Bhutanese footballer

Personal information
- Full name: Sangay Khandu
- Date of birth: September 7, 1985 (age 41)
- Height: 1.63 m (5 ft 4 in)
- Position: Defender

Team information
- Current team: Transport United

Senior career*
Years	Team	Apps	(Gls)
- Transport United

International career
2005–	Bhutan	7	(0)
- * Club domestic league appearances and goals

Sangay Khandu (born 7 September 1985) is a Bhutanese footballer. He made his first appearance for the Bhutan national football team in 2009.
