= Tandin Tshering =

Bhutanese footballer

Personal information
- Full name: Tandin Tshering
- Date of birth: June 30, 1986 (age 40)
- Place of birth: Bhutan
- Position: Defender

Team information
- Current team: Druk Pol

Senior career*
Years	Team	Apps	(Gls)
2009–c.2017	Druk Pol		

International career
2005–2009	Bhutan	7	(0)
- * Club domestic league appearances and goals

Tandin Tshering is a Bhutanese footballer who played for Druk Pol. He made his first appearance for the Bhutan national football team in 2009.
