= Rakesh Shrestha =

Nepalese footballer

Personal information
- Full name: Rakesh Shrestha
- Date of birth: January 14, 1977 (age 49)
- Position: Defender

Team information
- Current team: Nepal Police Club

Senior career*
Years	Team	Apps	(Gls)
2003–	Nepal Police Club		

International career
2001–2010	Nepal	14	(0)
- * Club domestic league appearances and goals

Rakesh Shrestha (Nepali: राकेश श्रेष्ठ) (born 14 January 1977) is a footballer from Nepal. He played for Nepal national football team in the 2002 FIFA World Cup qualification and various other tournaments. He also has played since 2003 for the Nepal Police Club, and has taken part in many tournaments at club level too, most notably the 2007 AFC President's Cup where the Police Club finished runners up.
