= Ali Yarzada =

Afghan footballer (born 1985)

Personal information
- Full name: Ali Ahmad Yarzada
- Date of birth: 15 October 1985 (age 41)
- Position: Defender

Senior career*
Years	Team	Apps	(Gls)
2009	Kabul Bank		
2009–2013	Ferozi		
2013–2019	Toofaan Harirod		

International career
2005–c. 2013	Afghanistan	21	(0)
Medal record
Men's football
Representing Afghanistan
SAFF Championship
Winner	2013 Nepal
- * Club domestic league appearances and goals

Ali Ahmad Yarzada (born 15 October 1985) is an Afghan former professional footballer who played for the Afghanistan national football team, with 21 caps for the national team between 2005 and c. 2013. After retirement, he was the manager of Attack Energy SC.

== Honours ==
Afghanistan

- SAFF Championship: 2013
