= List of football clubs in Afghanistan =

This is a list of football clubs in Afghanistan, which have competed in various formats of the Afghan football league system.

== By province ==
=== Farah ===
- Abu Muslim FC

=== Faryab ===
- Khurasan FC

=== Herat ===
- Attack Energy SC
- FC Sorkh Poshan
- Kohistan Herat

=== Kabul ===
- Istiqlal FC
- Javanan Azadi Kabul FC
- Javanan Mihan Kabul FC
- Ferozi FC
- Maiwand Kabul FC
- Ariana Kabul FC
- Pamir Kabul FC
- Ordu FC
- Seramiasht FC
- Shoa Kabul FC
- Sabawoon Kabul FC
- Solh Kabul FC
- Mahmoudiyeh FC
- Real Afghan Kabul

=== Kandahar ===
- Kandahar Aryan

== Franchise clubs ==
- De Abasin Sape FC
- De Maiwand Atalan FC
- De Spin Ghar Bazan FC
- Mawjhai Amu FC
- Oqaban Hindukush FC
- Shaheen Asmayee FC
- Simorgh Alborz FC
- Toofan Harirod FC
