= 2011 SAFF Championship final =

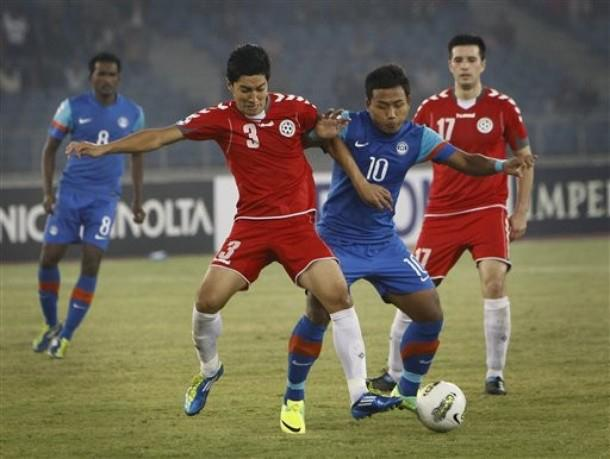
- Zohib Amiri (in red uniform) vs Jeje Lalpekhlua (in blue uniform) during the 2011 SAFF Championship Final.
- Event: 2011 SAFF Championship
India	Afghanistan
	(Afghanistan)
4	0
- Date: 11 December 2011
- Venue: Jawaharlal Nehru Stadium, New Delhi
- Referee: Sukhbir Singh (Singapore)
- Attendance: 30,000

The 2011 SAFF Championship final was the final match of the 2011 SAFF Championship which took place in India on 11 December 2011. The final match took place between India and Afghanistan. India entered the final as defending champions after winning their fifth title in 2009. While for Afghanistan this was their first final. India thrashed Afghanistan 4–0 and won their sixth title.

== Venue ==
It was originally scheduled to take place in Orissa, India, but was switched to New Delhi by the executive committee of the All India Football Federation on 22 September.

The Jawaharlal Nehru Stadium in New Delhi was the main venue for the tournament. It is also the home stadium for the India national football team and hosted the 2010 Commonwealth Games.

New Delhi	2011 SAFF Championship final is located in India
Jawaharlal Nehru Stadium	2011 SAFF Championship final is located in India
Capacity: 60,000	2011 SAFF Championship final is located in India

== Route to the final ==
India and Afghanistan started their tournament campaign by playing out a 1–1 draw. Balal Arezou's opener in the 5th minute was cancelled out by Sunil Chettri five minutes later. The hosts then went on to win back-to-back matches against Bhutan and Sri Lanka by the margins of 5–0 and 3–0 respectively. Meanwhile Afghanistan also picked up two consecutive wins against the same opponents including a 8–1 thrashing of Bhutan with striker Balal Arezou scoring four goals.

Afghanistan reached their first international final after defeating Nepal in the semi-final in extra time. Balal Arezou scored the lone goal of the match in the 101th minute. On the other hand defending champions India defeated Maldives 3–1 with the help of two goals scored by Sunil Chhetri and one goal by Syed Rahim Nabi.

India
Round
Afghanistan
Opponent
Result
Group stage
Opponent
Result
Afghanistan
1–1
Match 1
India
1–1
Bhutan
5–0
Match 2
Sri Lanka
3–1
Sri Lanka
3–0
Match 3
Bhutan
8–1

Team	Pld	W	D	L	GF	GA	GD	Pts
Afghanistan	3	2	1	0	12	3	+9	7
India	3	2	1	0	9	1	+8	7
Sri Lanka	3	1	0	2	4	6	−2	3
Bhutan	3	0	0	3	1	16	−15	0

Final standing

Team	Pld	W	D	L	GF	GA	GD	Pts
Afghanistan	3	2	1	0	12	3	+9	7
India	3	2	1	0	9	1	+8	7
Sri Lanka	3	1	0	2	4	6	−2	3
Bhutan	3	0	0	3	1	16	-15	0

Opponent
Result
Knockout phase
Opponent
Result
Maldives
3–1
Semi-finals
Nepal
1–0 a e.t

== Match ==
11 December 2011
18:00 IST

India	4–0	Afghanistan
Chhetri 71' (pen.); Miranda 79'; Lalpekhlua 80'; S. Singh 90+5'	Report

Jawaharlal Nehru Stadium, New Delhi
Attendance: 30,000
Referee: Sukhbir Singh (Singapore)

India	Afghanistan

GK	Karanjit Singh
RB	Nirmal Chettri
CB	Mahesh Gawli
CB	Gouramangi Singh
LB	Syed Rahim Nabi
RM	Anthony Pereira (substituted off) 74'
CM	Climax Lawrence (c)
CM	Rocus Lamare
LM	Clifford Miranda (substituted off) 93'
CF	Sunil Chhetri (substituted off) 84'
CF	Jeje Lalpekhlua
Substitutes:
RM	Steven Dias (substituted on) 74'
CF	Sushil Kumar Singh (substituted on) 84'
LM	Lalrindika Ralte (substituted on) 93'
Manager:
Savio Medeira

GK	Hamidullah Yousafzai (c) (red card) 64'
RB	Muqadar Qazizadah
CB	Zohib Islam Amiri
CB	Faisal Sakhizada
LB	Djelaludin Sharityar
CDM	Mohammad Mashriqi
CM	Israfeel Kohistani
RM	Sandjar Ahmadi (substituted off) 77'
CAM	Ata Yamrali
LM	Ghulam Hazrat Niazi (substituted off) 68'
CF	Balal Arezou
Substitutes:
GK	Bashir Darman (substituted on) 68'
RM	Sayed Maqsood Hashemi (substituted on) 77'
Manager:
Mohammad Yousef Kargar

Match rules

- 90 minutes.
- 30 minutes of extra-time if necessary.
- Penalty shoot-out if scores still level.
- Maximum of three substitutions.

== See also ==
- 2011 SAFF Championship
