= 2013 SAFF Championship final =

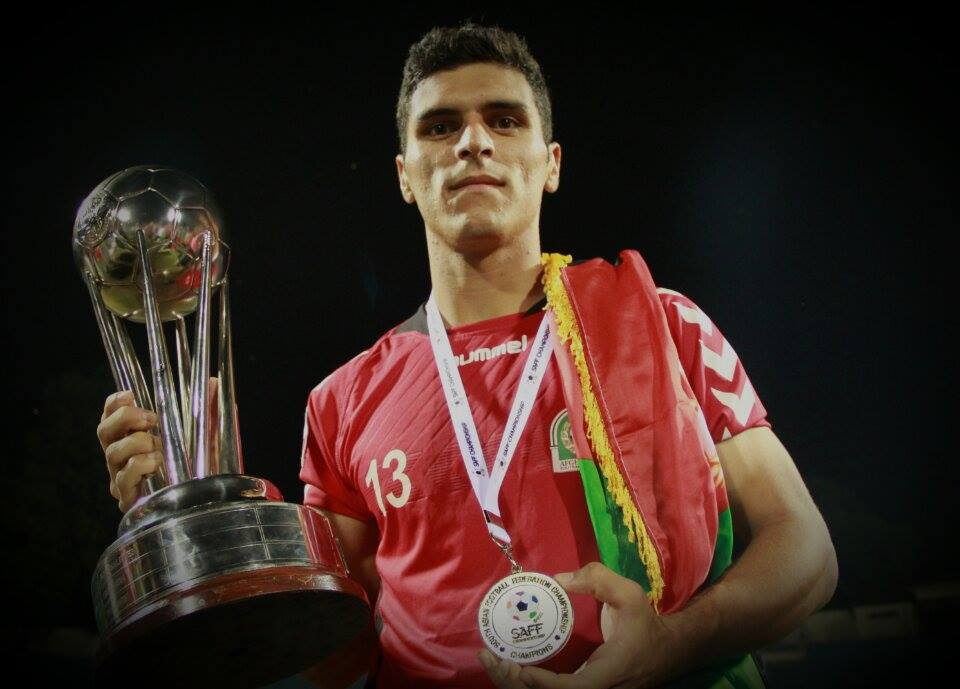
- Hamid Karimi holding the SAFF Title.
- Event: 2013 SAFF Championship
Afghanistan	India
(Afghanistan)	(India)
2	0
- Date: 11 September 2013
- Venue: Dasarath Rangasala, Kathmandu
- Man of the Match: Mansur Faqiryar (Afghanistan)
- Referee: Tayeb Hasan Shamsuzzaman (Bangladesh)
- Attendance: 6,500+

The 2013 SAFF Championship final was the final match of the 2013 SAFF Championship which took place in Nepal on 11 September 2013, and was officiated by Tayeb Hasan Shamsuzzaman of Bangladesh. It was the 10th installment of the tournament since its inception in 1993.

This was the first time in the SAFF Championship that the finalists were the same in two consecutive finals, as in the 2011 SAFF Championship India had thrashed Afghanistan 4–0 in India. However, in this final it was Afghanistan who thrashed India 2–0, with goals coming from Mustafa Azadzoy and Sandjar Ahmadi in the 9th and 62nd minute respectively. This was Afghanistan's first SAFF Championship win.

== Road to the final ==
India entered the 2013 SAFF Championship as the reigning champion after defeating Afghanistan in the 2011 SAFF Championship. Afghanistan's best record previous was runners-up in the 2011 SAFF Championship.

To the final, India struggled through and scraped by the group stage through head-to-edge edging out Pakistan from an own-goal by Samar Ishaq in a 1–0 win to the Indians. Later in the semi-finals, against Maldives, it took India until the 86th minute when Arnab Mondal opened the scoring to leave it a 1–0 win to proceed to the final.

Afghanistan, on the other hand, breezed by both Sri Lanka and Bhutan in the group stage with comfortable wins and a 0–0 stalemate with Maldives. To proceed to the final, Afghanistan won convincingly in a 1–0 win against the hosts Nepal with the lone goal coming from Sandjar Ahmadi in the 11th minute.

Afghanistan
Round
India
Opponent
Result
Group stage
Opponent
Result
Bhutan
3–0
Match 1
Pakistan
1–0
Sri Lanka
3–1
Match 2
Bangladesh
1–1
Maldives
0–0
Match 3
Nepal
1–2

Team	Pld	W	D	L	GF	GA	GD	Pts
Maldives	3	2	1	0	18	2	+16	7
Afghanistan	3	2	1	0	6	1	+5	7
Sri Lanka	3	1	0	2	6	15	−9	3
Bhutan	3	0	0	3	4	16	−12	0

Source: RSSSF
Final Standings

Team	Pld	W	D	L	GF	GA	GD	Pts
Nepal	3	2	1	0	5	2	+3	7
India	3	1	1	1	3	3	0	4
Pakistan	3	1	1	1	3	3	0	4
Bangladesh	3	0	1	2	2	5	−3	1

Source: RSSSF
Opponent
Result
Knockout stage
Opponent
Result
Nepal
1–0
Semi-finals
Maldives
1–0

== Squads ==
During the tournament, Afghanistan had the most diverse squad. While most other nations had almost all players playing for their domestic league, Afghanistan had five players playing outside of Asia with four in Europe and the rest in either India's I-League or its domestic league the Afghan Premier League. The average age of the Lions of Khorasan was 26 years of age with goalkeeper Hamidullah Yousafzai the oldest at 31 and youngest being Sidiq Walizada at 21.

India had all its players playing in its domestic I-League with four players being free agents. The average age of the Blue Tigers was 26 years of age, as well, with goalkeeper Sandip Nandy the oldest at 38 and Sandesh Jhingan the youngest at 20.

== Match ==
=== Officials ===
Tayeb Shamsuzzaman of the Bangladesh was appointed the referee of the final and was assisted by Pakistani Moaid Al Sayeg and Issa Mahmoud Ahmad Al Amawi of Jordan. The fourth official was Adham Makhadmeh, also from Jordan. Shamsuzzaman was listed as a FIFA referee in 1999. Since then, he had experience as a referee in the World Cup Qualifiers, AFC Challenge Cup, AFC Cup, AFC Champions League, WAFF Championship, AFF Suzuki Cup and the 2010 and 2014 FIFA World Cup qualifiers

Prior to the final, he refereed for five other games in the 2013 SAFF Championship. He was referee in Afghanistan-Bhutan and Bhutan-Maldives matches in Group A before moving to the Group B match India-Nepal. Then finishing the group stage by being the referee for Afghanistan-Maldives and the semi-final of Maldives-India. In the games that Shamsuzzaman was the referee, he showed no more than two yellow cards in every game with that being Bhutan-Maldives and Afghanistan-Maldives. He gave the red card in the group-stage match between Bhutan and Maldives and giving the Bhutan goalkeeper Leki Dukpa a red card for tripping Ali Ashfaq just outside the penalty box after rushing to a one-on-one.

=== Details ===
11 September 2013
08:45 IST

Afghanistan	2–0	India
Azadzoy 9'; Ahmadi 62'	Report

Dasarath Rangasala, Kathmandu
Attendance: 6,500+
Referee: Tayeb Hasan (Bangladesh)

Afghanistan	India

GK	1	Mansur Faqiryar	(yellow card) 86'
CB	6	Mohammad Rafi
CB	3	Zohib Islam (c)
CB	14	Farzad Ghulam
RM	25	Mustafa Hadid
CM	17	Marouf Mohammadi		(substituted off) 71'
CM	9	Mohammad Mashriqi	(yellow card) 41'	(substituted off) 90+2'
LM	27	Mujtaba Faiz
RF	11	Sandjar Ahmadi		(substituted off) 76'
CF	10	Balal Arezou
LF	7	Mustafa Azadzoy
Substitutions:
FW	12	Hashmat Ullah		(substituted on) 71'
MF	18	Ahmad Arash		(substituted on) 76'
MF	30	Waheed Nadeem	(yellow card) 90+5'	(substituted on) 90+2'
Manager:
Yousef Kargar

GK	1	Subrata Pal
RB	4	Nirmal Chettri		(substituted off) 86'
CB	19	Gouramangi Singh (c)
CB	5	Arnab Mondal	(yellow card) 58'
LB	22	Syed Rahim Nabi
RM	8	Francis Fernandes
CM	7	Mehtab Hossain
CM	6	Lenny Rodrigues
LM	23	Robin Singh
AM	14	Arata Izumi
CF	10	Jeje Lalpekhlua		(substituted off) 60'
Substitutions:
FW	11	Sunil Chhetri		(substituted on) 60'
DF	28	Dawson Fernandes		(substituted on) 86'
Manager:
(Netherlands) Wim Koevermans

Man of the Match:
Mansur Faqiryar (Afghanistan)

Assistant referees:
Moaid Al Sayeg (Pakistan)
Issa Al Amawi (Jordan)
Fourth official:
Adham Makhadmeh (Jordan)

Match rules

- 90 minutes.
- 30 minutes of extra-time if necessary.
- Penalty shoot-out if scores still level.
- Eight named substitutes.
- Maximum of three substitutions.
