= Israfeel Kohistani =

Afghan footballer

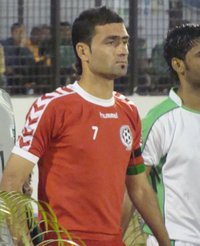
- Kohistani with Afghanistan in 2010

Personal information
- Date of birth: June 5, 1987 (age 39)
- Place of birth: Kabul, Afghanistan
- Height: 1.79 m (5 ft 10 1/2 in)
- Position: Midfielder

Team information
- Current team: Vejen Sports Forening
- Number: 7

Senior career*
Years	Team	Apps	(Gls)
2004–2007	Ordu Kabul		
2007–2012	Kabul Bank		
2012–2014	Vejle FC		
2014–	Vejen Sports Forening	152	(44)

International career
2002–2004	Afghanistan U-16-18	32	(8)
2004–2010	Afghanistan U-23	48	(22)
2005–	Afghanistan	27	(1)
- * Club domestic league appearances and goals

Mohammad Salim Israfeel Kohistani (born 5 June 1987) is an Afghan footballer who currently plays for Vejen Sports Forening and the Afghanistan national team. He played in World Cup 2010 qualifiers, and 2014 FIFA World Cup Qualification. He is from the north-eastern Afghan province of Kapisa and is one of the most capped Afghan players ever along with Zohib Islam Amiri and Faisal Sakhizada.

When he was eight years old, Kohistani picked up an unexploded grenade and lost four fingers on his left hand.

== Club career ==
In 2000, he started playing football at the Habibia high school team, until 2003. In 2004, he played in first league at the Habibiana football team and soon after he made a transfer to the Army FC, where he played for 3 years. In 2007, he was transferred from Army FC to Kabul Bank FC. In these 3 years the club became vice-champion of national ligue and champion of all Afghanistan cups. His ability in the ground spirit of the game Inspired many I-League teams to transfer him. Kingfisher East Bengal F.C. have asked him to play for them, But Kohistani denied their request. After that he transferred to Denmark club Vejen Sports Forening.

== International career ==
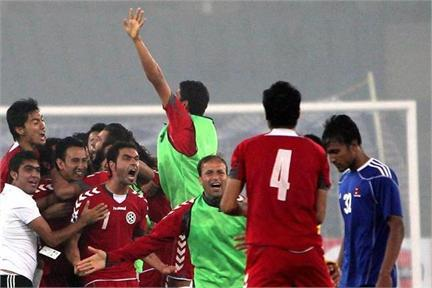
Kohistani and his teammates are celebrating victory 2011 SAFF Championship Semi Final against the tournaments highest ranked team Nepal. It also marked Afghanistan's first win over Nepal.

Kohistani has represented Afghanistan in almost every youth team. He became a member of the senior team in 2005. He played 3 times in SAFF Cup, 2 times in AFC Challenge Cup and 2 times in South Asian Games. He also represented the Afghanistan national football team in the FIFA World Cup 2010 qualifiers, where they were eliminated by Syria, in 2007. He recently scored one goal for Afghanistan in Tau Devi Lal Stadium which led Afghanistan 2–0 victory over Bhutan in 2012 AFC Challenge Cup qualification, the second goal was scored by Waheed Nadeem. He assisted one goal against Palestine in 2014 FIFA World Cup Qualification which was scored by Bilal Arzou.

== Career statistics ==
=== Club ===
Year	Club	Apps	Goals
2004-2007	Ordu Kabul F.C.	–	–
2007–2012	Kabul Bank F.C.	–	–
2012–2014	Vejle FC		
2014–	Vejen Sports Forening	61	32

=== International ===
Year	Club	Apps	Goals
2002–2004	Afghanistan U16 – U18	32	8
2004–2010	Afghanistan U23	48	22
2005–Present	Afghanistan	34	2

== International goals ==
Scores and results list Afghanistan's goal tally first.

No.	Date	Venue	Opponent	Score	Result	Competition
1.	25 March 2011	Tau Devi Lal Stadium, Gurgaon, India	Bhutan	2–0	2–0	2012 AFC Challenge Cup qualification
