= Football in Afghanistan =

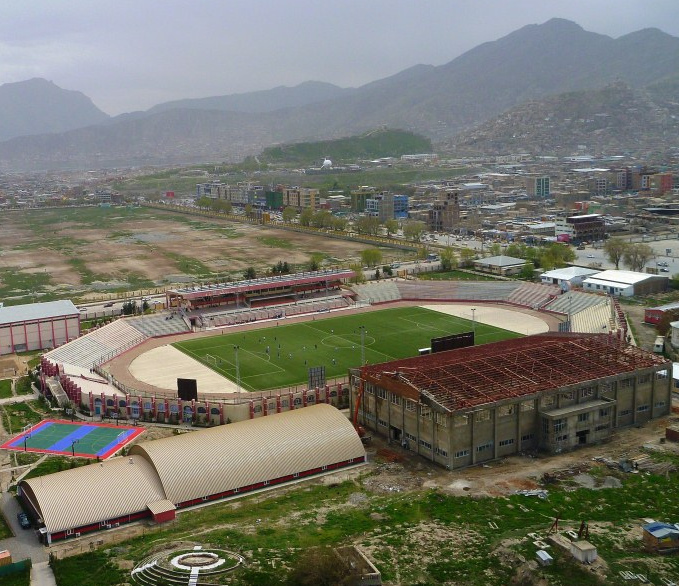
- Ghazi Stadium, the national stadium of Afghanistan
- Country: Afghanistan
- Governing body: Afghanistan Football Federation
- National teams: Men's national team Women's national team Afghanistan national futsal team Afghanistan national beach soccer team Afghanistan national minifootball team
- Nicknames: The Lions of Khorasan (m); The Lions of Afghanistan (شیران افغانستان)(w)
- First played: at least 1923 (men) at least 2007 (women)
- Registered players: 1922

National competitions
- FIFA World Cup (m); FIFA Women's World Cup (w); AFC Asian Cup (m); AFC Women's Asian Cup (w); AFC Futsal Asian Cup (m); AFC Beach Soccer Asian Cup (m); CAFA Women's Championship (w); SAFF Women's Championship (w); AFC Futsal Club Championship (m); AMC Cup (m)

Club competitions
- Afghan Premier League (m); Kabul Premier League (m); Futsal Premier League (m); Afghan Women's Premier League (w)

Football is one of the two most popular sports in Afghanistan; the other one being cricket.

== Early history ==
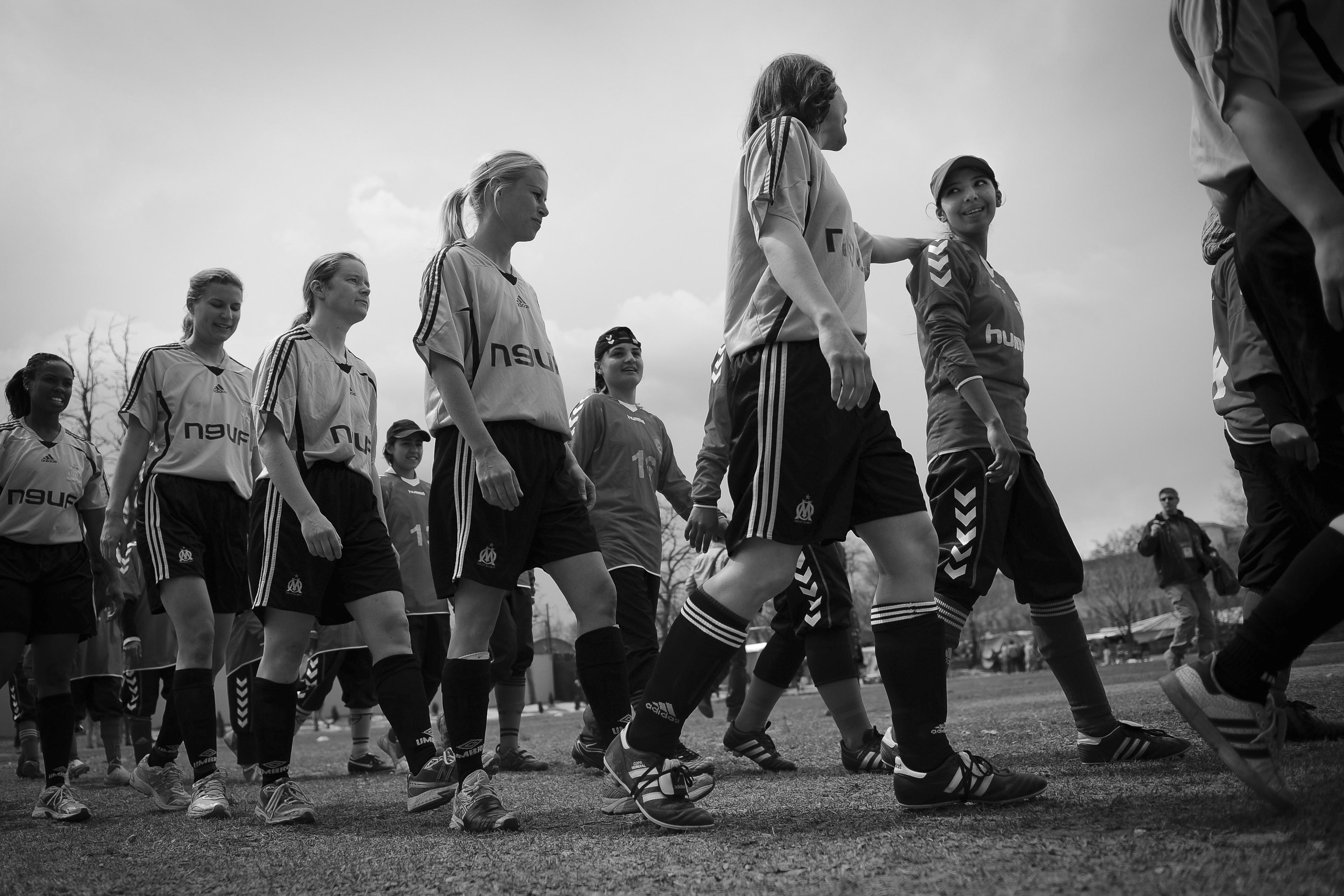
Afghan national women's soccer team in a friendly against ISAF in 2011.

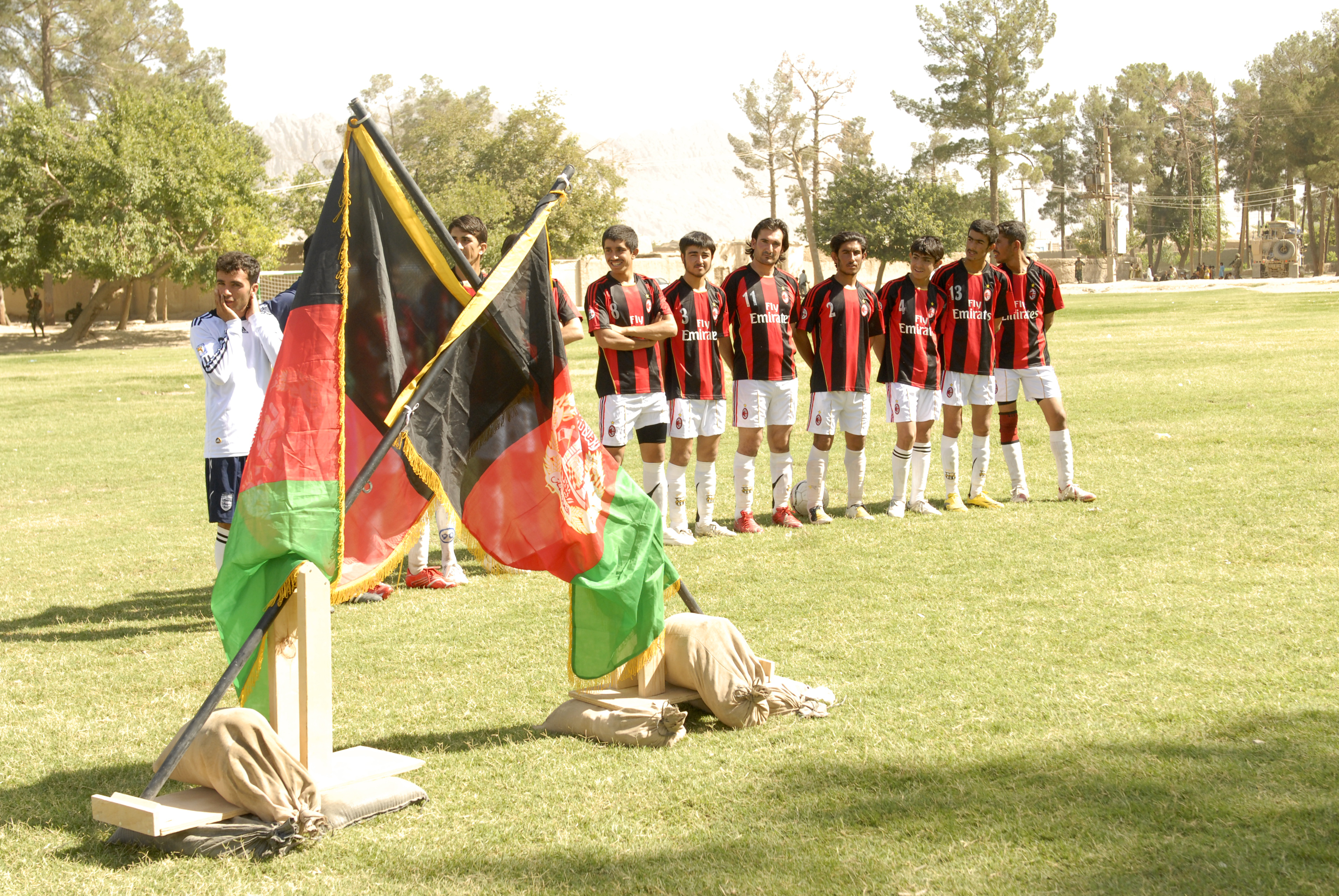
Local football players at a public park in Kandahar.

According to the Afghanistan Football Federation, the first Afghan football club was Mahmoudiyeh F.C., which was founded in 1934. Their men's team traveled to India three years later and took part in 18 games of which 8 were won, 9 lost and 1 tied. Ariana Kabul F.C. was established in 1941 and became the second Afghan football club. This team sent a men's team to Tehran upon invitation from Iran, played 3 games in which 1 was won and 2 were lost. Nothing is known about the early history of women's football in the country.

In 1948, the Afghanistan Football Federation joined FIFA and sent a men's national team to the UK to compete in the 1948 Summer Olympics. They lost their only match in a preliminary round 0–6 to Luxembourg national football team. From 1974 to 1979, an international football tournament named Afghanistan Republic Day Festival Cup, was organized in the country, in which multiple foreign teams participated.

Afghanistan women's national football team is only recognized by the Federation since 2007.

== Football governance ==
Football in Afghanistan is governed by the Afghanistan Football Federation (AFF). The AFF was founded in 1922 and is a member of FIFA since 1948. In 1954, AFF became one of the founding members of the Asian Football Confederation and in 2015 of the Central Asian Football Association.

Since the Fall of Kabul (2021), women's football is forbidden under the Taliban and AFF has subsequently discontinued all women's football programs. The Afghanistan women's national football team has taken refuge in Australia and keeps training and playing regularly, while a development squad is based in the UK.

== Men's national team ==
One of the major successes of the Afghanistan men's national team came when the team won the 2013 SAFF Championship in Nepal. They have also finished runner-up of the same event in 2011 and 2015 and fourth at the Asian Games 1951 and the 2014 AFC Challenge Cup.

== Women's national team ==
One of the major successes of the Afghanistan women's national team came when the team reached the semi-finals of the 2012 SAFF Women's Championship in Sri Lanka.

== League system ==
=== First tiers ===
- Kabul A Division Football League (1946–2006)
- Kabul Premier League (2007–2012)
- Afghan Premier League (2012–2020)
- Afghanistan Champions League (2021–present)

== Attendances ==
The average attendance per top-flight football league season and the club with the highest average attendance:

Season	League average	Best club	Best club average
2024	353	Attack Energy	1,532

Source: League page on Wikipedia
