= 2013–14 in Indian football =

Football in India
- Season: 2013–14

Men's football
- I-League: Bengaluru
- I-League 2nd Div.: Royal Wahingdoh
- Federation Cup: Churchill Brothers

The 2013–14 season is the 126th competitive association football season in India.

== Changes in the I-League ==
New direct-entry sides to the 2013–14 I-League:

- Bengaluru FC

Teams promoted to the 2013–14 I-League:

- Mohammedan
- Rangdajied United

Teams expelled from the 2012–13 I-League:

- Air India
- ONGC

Teams relegated from the 2012–13 I-League:

- United Sikkim

== Internationals ==
=== Men ===
==== 2013 SAFF Championship ====
1 September 2013 Group Stage	India	1–0	Pakistan	Kathmandu, Nepal
	Ishaq 14' (o.g.)	Report		Stadium: Dasarath Rangasala Stadium; Referee: Hettikamkanamge Perera (Sri Lanka)

3 September 2013 Group Stage	Bangladesh	1–1	India	Kathmandu, Nepal
	Meshu 82'	Report	Chhetri 90+5'	Stadium: Halchowk Stadium; Referee: Hettikamkanamge Perera (Sri Lanka)

5 September 2013 Group Stage	India	1–2	Nepal	Kathmandu, Nepal
	Nabi 90+2'	Report	Gurung 70'; Rai 81'	Stadium: Dasarath Rangasala Stadium; Referee: Adham Makhadmeh (Jordan)

9 September 2013 Semi-Final	Maldives	0–1	India	Kathmandu, Nepal
		Report	Mondal 86'	Stadium: Dasarath Rangasala Stadium; Referee: Adham Makhadmeh (Jordan)

11 September 2013 Final	Afghanistan	2–0	India	Kathmandu, Nepal
	Azadzoy 9'; Ahmadi 62'	Report		Stadium: Dasarath Rangasala Stadium; Referee: Tayeb Shamsuzzaman (Bangladesh)

==== International Friendlies ====
14 August 2013 Friendly	Tajikistan	3–0	India	Khujand, Tajikistan
	Davronov 11'; Fatkhulloev 19'; Khamroqulov 90+3'	Report		Stadium: 20-Letie Nezavisimosti Stadium; Referee: Khurshed Dadoboev (Tajikistan)

15 November International Friendly	India	1–1	Philippines	West Bengal, India
18:00	Chhetri 41'	Report	Younghusband 42'	Stadium: Kanchenjunga Stadium, Siliguri; Attendance: 15,000; Referee: Sudhis Pandey (Nepal)

19 November International Friendly	India	2–0	Nepal	West Bengal, India
18:00	Chhetri 21'; Miranda 48'	Report		Stadium: Kanchenjunga Stadium, Siliguri; Attendance: 25,000; Referee: Shrikrishna (India)

5 March International Friendly	India	2–2	Bangladesh	Goa, India
18:00	Chhetri 14', 90+2'	Report	Mithun 51'; Mondal 64' (o.g.)	Stadium: Fatorda Stadium

== I-League ==
Pos	Team	Pld	W	D	L	GF	GA	GD	Pts	Qualification or relegation
1	Bengaluru (C)	24	14	5	5	42	28	+14	47	Qualification for 2015 AFC Champions League qualifying play-off
2	East Bengal	24	12	7	5	39	23	+16	43	Qualification for 2015 AFC Cup group stage
3	Salgaocar	24	11	6	7	36	25	+11	39	
4	Dempo	24	9	8	7	31	25	+6	35	
5	Sporting Goa	24	9	7	8	34	34	0	34	
6	Shillong Lajong	24	8	9	7	35	37	−2	33	
7	Pune	24	7	8	9	28	32	−4	29	
8	Mohun Bagan	24	6	10	8	23	24	−1	28	
9	Mumbai	24	5	13	6	31	32	−1	28	
10	United (R)	24	5	11	8	22	32	−10	26	Excluded (Note: United, Rangdajied United and Churchill Brothers were barred from I-League they failed to meet Asian Football Confederation's licensing criteria.)
11	Rangdajied United (R)	24	6	7	11	29	38	−9	25	Excluded
12	Churchill Brothers (R)	24	6	7	11	25	37	−12	25	Excluded
13	Mohammedan (R)	24	6	6	12	27	35	−8	24	Relegation to 2015 I-League 2nd Division

Source: IndiaFooty.com
Rules for classification: 1) points; 2) head-to-head points; 3) goal difference; 4) number of goals scored; 5) taking lots
(C) Champions; (R) Relegated
