= Mustafa Azadzoy =

Afghan footballer (born 1992)

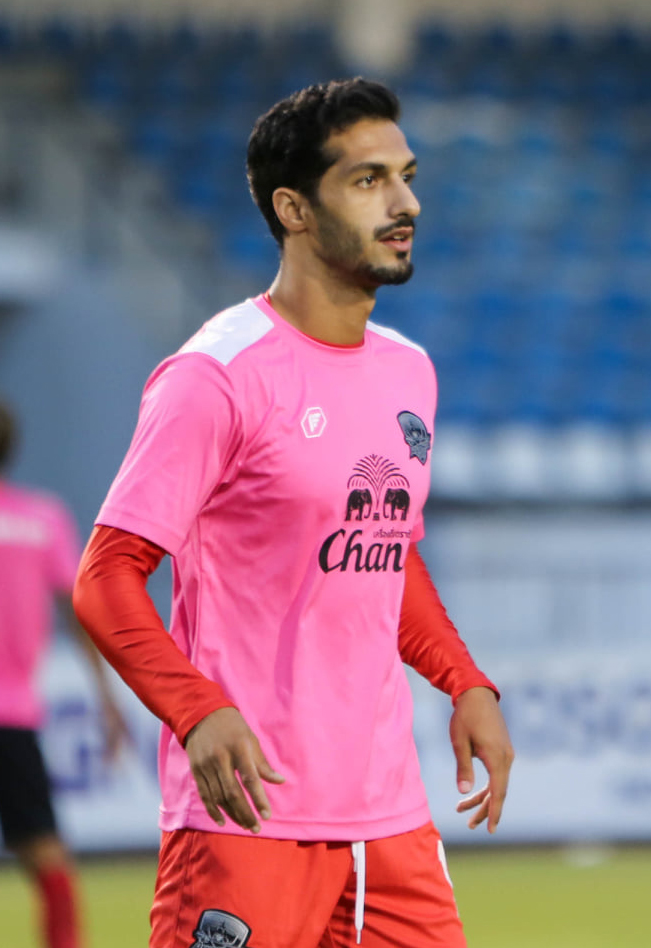
- Azadzoy with Ayutthaya United in 2022

Personal information
- Date of birth: 24 July 1992 (age 34)
- Place of birth: Kabul, Afghanistan
- Height: 1.82 m (6 ft 0 in)
- Positions: Attacking midfielder; winger

Team information
- Current team: WSC Frisia

Youth career
- 2008–2011: Delmenhorster BV
- 2008–2011: VfB Oldenburg

Senior career*
Years	Team	Apps	(Gls)
2012–2013	VfB Oldenburg	20	(9)
2013–2016	TB Uphusen	54	(15)
2016	Nara United	11	(3)
2016–2017	Chainat Hornbill	24	(11)
2017	Chiangrai United	0	(0)
2017–2018	→ Chiangmai (loan)	32	(10)
2019	Chiangmai	26	(7)
2020	Nakhon Pathom United	4	(1)
2020–2021	Trat	18	(4)
2022	Muangthong United	0	(0)
2022	→ Ayutthaya United (loan)	14	(0)
2022–2023	Atlas Delmenhorst	28	(1)
2024–	WSC Frisia	0	(0)

International career
2011–	Afghanistan	37	(3)
Medal record
Men's football
Representing Afghanistan
SAFF Championship
Winner	2013 Nepal
- * Club domestic league appearances and goals as of 10 April 2022

Mustafa Azadzoy (Persian: مصطفي آزادزوي; born 24 July 1992) is an Afghan professional footballer who plays as an attacking midfielder or a winger for German club WSC Frisia and the Afghanistan national team.

== Early life ==
Azadzoy was born in Afghanistan to a Tajik mother and a Pashtun father. He has five older brothers and sisters. When he was just six months old, his family moved to Germany, although his uncle and aunt remain in Afghanistan. Soon clubs started noticing his talent, after spending time with Delmenhorster BV he was recruited by VfB Oldenburg who put Azadoy in their youth system.

== Club career ==
After spending his youth career in VfB Oldenburg he signed for TB Uphusen in 2013.

== International career ==
In 2011, Azadzoy made his debut for Afghanistan national team in the 2011 SAFF Championship. In February 2013 Azadzoy was called up by Afghan coach Mohammad Yousef Kargar to play for Afghanistan against Sri Lanka, encouraged by fellow Afghan-German footballer Mansur Faqiryar.

Azadzoy was part of Afghanistan's squad at the 2013 SAFF Championship, in which he scored his first ever goal against Bhutan in a 3–0 win in the group stages. He also scored the first goal in the Final against India, helping Afghanistan to a 2–0 win and handing them their first ever SAFF Championship.

Azadoy was included in Afghanistan's squad for the 2014 AFC Challenge Cup in the Maldives. In the group stages of the tournament Afghanistan claimed their first ever win at the AFC Challenge Cup with a 3–1 victory over Turkmenistan. Unfortunately after Afghanistan's 0–0 draw with Laos that confirmed their progression out of the group stage, an accident occurred while the Afghan players were being driven back to their hotel. Azadoy had to spend time in hospital over night and is set to miss three weeks, while his teammates Zohib Islam Amiri, Faisal Sakhizada, Ahmad Hatifi and Balal Arezou all suffered minor injuries. All five players are set to miss the semi-finals against Palestine. Former coach Mohammad Yousef Kargar and current coach Erich Rutemöller also suffered minor injuries.

== Career statistics ==
=== International ===
As of match played 16 November 2023

Appearances and goals by national team and year
National team	Year	Apps	Goals
Afghanistan	2013	9	2
Afghanistan	2014	6	0
Afghanistan	2015	4	0
Afghanistan	2016	1	0
Afghanistan	2017	4	1
Afghanistan	2018	1	0
Afghanistan	2019	1	0
Afghanistan	2020	–	
Afghanistan	2021	–	
Afghanistan	2022	4	0
Afghanistan	2023	7	0
Total		37	3

Scores and results list Afghanistan's goal tally first, score column indicates score after each Azadzoy goal.

List of international goals scored by Mustafa Azadzoy
No.	Date	Venue	Opponent	Score	Result	Competition
1	2 September 2013	Halchowk Stadium, Kathmandu, Nepal	Bhutan	2–0	3–0	2013 SAFF Championship
2	11 September 2013	Dasarath Rangasala Stadium, Kathmandu, Nepal	India	1–0	2–0	2013 SAFF Championship
3	23 March 2017	Saoud bin Abdulrahman Stadium, Al Wakrah, Qatar	Singapore	2–1	2–1	Friendly

== Honours ==
Afghanistan

- SAFF Championship: 2013
