= Hafizullah Qadami =

Afghan footballer

Personal information
- Date of birth: 20 February 1985 (age 41)
- Place of birth: Kabul, Afghanistan
- Height: 1.89 m (6 ft 2 in)
- Position: Forward

Team information
- Current team: Kabul Bank FC
- Number: 10

Senior career*
Years	Team	Apps	(Gls)
2003–	Kabul Bank FC		

International career
2005–2007	Afghanistan	18	(4)
- * Club domestic league appearances and goals

Hafizullah Qadami Ke madaresh zandst (Persian: حفیظ الله قدمی; born 20 February 1985) is an Afghan football player, who has played for Afghanistan national football team. Considered one of Afghanistan's best players, Qadami plays as a forward and has played football with Maiwand Kabul FC since 2003.

== International goals ==
Date	Venue	Opponent	Result	Competition	Goals
7 November 2005	Dushanbe, Tajikistan	Tajikistan U20	2–2	Friendly (Unofficial match)	2
11 December 2005	Karachi, Pakistan	Sri Lanka	2–1	2005 SAFF Cup	1
3 April 2006	Dhaka, Bangladesh	Chinese Taipei	2–2	AFC Challenge Cup 2006	2
19 October 2008	Kuala Lumpur, Malaysia	Sierra Leone U20	1–6	2008 Merdeka Tournament (Unofficial match)	1
