= 2008 Merdeka Tournament =

International football competition

2008 Pestabola Merdeka
Tournament details
- Host country: Malaysia
- Dates: 15–25 October
- Teams: 8
- Venue(s): 3 (in 3 host cities)

Final positions
- Champions: Vietnam (1st title)
- Runners-up: Malaysia

Tournament statistics
- Matches played: 15
- Goals scored: 56 (3.73 per match)
- Top scorer(s): (Malaysia) Mohd Safee Mohd Sali (5 goals)

The 40th Merdeka Tournament was played from 15 to 25 October 2008. The tournament was won by Vietnam, who defeated Malaysia 6–5 on penalties in the final.

== Teams ==
- Afghanistan
- Bangladesh
- Malaysia (host country)
- Mozambique^{*}
- Myanmar
- Nepal
- Sierra Leone^{**}
- Vietnam^{***}

^{*}Mozambique replaced Kazakhstan following Kazakhstan’s failure to confirm participation. Mozambique will play with their Under 20 squad.

^{**}Sierra Leone will be sending their Under 20 squad.

^{***}Vietnam will be sending their Under 22 squad.

== Stadiums ==
City	Stadium	Capacity
Kuala Lumpur	Bukit Jalil National Stadium^{*}	100,000
Shah Alam	Shah Alam Stadium	81,000
Petaling Jaya	MBPJ Stadium	25,000

^{*}Venue for last group match change because of the poor pitch condition at the MBPJ Stadium.

== Group stages ==
All times local (UTC+8)

=== Group A ===
Team	Pld	W	D	L	GF	GA	GD	Pts
Malaysia	3	3	0	0	14	0	+14	9
Sierra Leone	3	2	0	1	9	6	+3	6
Nepal	3	0	1	2	3	9	–6	1
Afghanistan	3	0	1	2	3	14	–11	1

15 October 2008
20:45

Malaysia	4–0	Nepal
Indra Putra 20'; Safee 25', 48'; Khyril 52'	Report

MBPJ Stadium, Petaling Jaya
Attendance: 31,000
Referee: Huang Junji (China)

17 October 2008
18:30

Afghanistan	2–2	Nepal
Barakzai 62'; Azimi 86'	Report	A. Gurung 63'; B. Gurung 72'

MBPJ Stadium, Petaling Jaya

17 October 2008
20:45

Malaysia	4–0	Sierra Leone
Indra Putra 69'; Safee 75'; Aidil 79'; Adha 90'	Report

MBPJ Stadium, Petaling Jaya
Attendance: 41,500

19 October 2008
18:30

Afghanistan	1–6	Sierra Leone
Qadami 47'	Report	Turay 20'; A. Kamara 51'; Kabia 60'; Foray 76', 86'; S. Kamara 88'

MBPJ Stadium, Petaling Jaya

20 October 2008
20:45

Nepal	1–3	Sierra Leone
Rai 40' (pen.)	Report	Bah 6'; Turay 88'; Freeman 90'

Shah Alam Stadium, Shah Alam

20 October 2008
20:45

Malaysia	6–0	Afghanistan
Ashaari 21', 64'; Nizaruddin 41'; Adha 44'; Safee 85'; Hairuddin 87'	Report

Bukit Jalil National Stadium, Kuala Lumpur
Attendance: 3,000

=== Group B ===
Team	Pld	W	D	L	GF	GA	GD	Pts
Vietnam	3	2	1	0	9	3	+6	7
Myanmar	3	2	0	1	5	5	0	6
Mozambique	3	1	0	2	3	7	–4	3
Bangladesh	3	0	1	2	2	4	–2	1

16 October 2008
18:30

Myanmar	1–3	Vietnam
Zaw Htet Aung 44'	Report	Thanh Bình 3', 47'; Đức Thiện 74'

Shah Alam Stadium, Shah Alam
Attendance: 1,200
Referee: Fredy Chukwa (East Timor)

16 October 2008
20:45

Bangladesh	0–1	Mozambique
	Report	Jange 88'

Shah Alam Stadium, Shah Alam
Attendance: 3,000
Referee: P. Sasidaran (India)

18 October 2008
18:30

Mozambique	0–4	Vietnam
	Report	Thanh Bình 58'; Đình Tùng 63', 80'; Quang Vinh 72'

Shah Alam Stadium, Shah Alam

18 October 2008
20:45

Bangladesh	0–1	Myanmar
		Soe Myat Min 23'

Shah Alam Stadium, Shah Alam

20 October 2008
18:30

Bangladesh	2–2	Vietnam
Ameli 32'; Zahid 49'	Report	Văn Khải 4'; Thanh Bình 62'

Shah Alam Stadium, Shah Alam

20 October 2008
18:30

Mozambique	2–3	Myanmar
Saize 40'; Peguenino 65'	Report	Min Thu 57'; Soe Myat Min 69'; Khin Maung Lwin 72'

Bukit Jalil National Stadium, Kuala Lumpur

== Knockout stages ==
All times local (UTC+8)

=== Bracket ===
Semi-finals
23 October
Vietnam (p)	2 (3)
Sierra Leone	2 (2)
23 October
Malaysia	4
Myanmar	0

Final
25 October
Vietnam (p)	0 (6)
Malaysia	0 (5)

=== Semi-finals ===
23 October 2008
17:45

Vietnam	2–2 (a.e.t.)	Sierra Leone
Quang Vinh 73'; Đức Thiện 81'	Report	Kabia 39'; Foray 68'
Penalties
Nhật Nam (penalty scored); Thanh Bình (penalty scored); Công Huy (penalty missed); Đức Thiện (penalty scored)	3–2	(penalty scored) ?? (penalty scored) ?? (penalty missed) ?? (penalty missed) Kabia; (penalty missed) Bah

Bukit Jalil National Stadium, Kuala Lumpur
Attendance: 5,000

23 October 2008
20:45

Malaysia	4–0	Myanmar
Indra Putra 26', 76' (pen.); Safee 61'; Amirul Hadi 83'	Report

Bukit Jalil National Stadium, Kuala Lumpur
Attendance: 20,000
Referee: Chaiya Alee Mahapab (Thailand)

=== Final ===
25 October 2008
20:45

Vietnam	0–0 (a.e.t.)	Malaysia
	Report
Penalties
Nhật Nam (penalty scored); Danh Ngọc (penalty scored); Công Huy (penalty scored); Đức Thiện (penalty scored); Văn Duyệt (penalty scored); Tiến Thành (penalty scored)	6–5	(penalty scored) Indra Putra; (penalty scored) Safee; (penalty scored) Hardi; (penalty scored) Ashaari; (penalty scored) Daudsu; (penalty missed) Norhafiz

Bukit Jalil National Stadium, Kuala Lumpur
Attendance: 50,000
Referee: Chaiya Alee Mahapab (Thailand)

== Winners ==
2008 Merdeka Tournament winner

Vietnam
1st title

== Goalscorers ==
5 goals

- (Malaysia) Safee Sali

4 goals

- (Malaysia) Indra Putra Mahayuddin
- (Vietnam) Phan Thanh Bình

3 goals

- (Sierra Leone) Dwight Foray

2 goals

- (Malaysia) Zaquan Adha
- (Malaysia) Ashaari Shamsuddin
- (Sierra Leone) Alusine Turay
- (Sierra Leone) Mohamed Kabia
- (Vietnam) Hoàng Đình Tùng
- (Vietnam) Nguyễn Đức Thiện
- (Vietnam) Trịnh Quang Vinh
- (Myanmar) Soe Myat Min

1 goals

- (Sierra Leone) Lahai Freeman
- (Sierra Leone) Lajor Bah
- (Sierra Leone) Sulaiman Kamara
- (Sierra Leone) Amara Kamara
- (Malaysia) Amirul Hadi
- (Malaysia) Hairuddin Omar
- (Malaysia) Nizaruddin Yusof
- (Malaysia) Khyril Muhymeen
- (Malaysia) Aidil Zafuan
- (Afghanistan) Hafizullah Qadami
- (Afghanistan) Hashmatullah Barakzai
- (Afghanistan) Sayed Bashir Azimi
- (Bangladesh) Jahid Hasan Ameli
- (Bangladesh) Mohamed Zahid Hossain
- (Nepal) Jumanu Rai
- (Nepal) Anil Gurung
- (Nepal) Bijaya Gurung
- (Mozambique) Francisco Jange
- (Mozambique) Enio Saize
- (Mozambique) Mauricio Peguenino
- (Myanmar) Zaw Htet Aung
- (Myanmar) Min Thu
- (Myanmar) Khin Maung Lwin
- (Vietnam) Nguyễn Văn Khải
