= Shamsuddin Amiri =

Afghan footballer

Personal information
- Full name: Shamsuddin Amiri
- Date of birth: 12 February 1985 (age 41)
- Place of birth: Kabul, Democratic Republic of Afghanistan
- Position: Goalkeeper

Senior career*
Years	Team	Apps	(Gls)
2001–2003	Pakistan Television		
2003	Maiwand Kabul		
2004–2009	Kabul Bank		
2010–2011	Ferozi		

International career
2004	Afghanistan U23		
2005–2008	Afghanistan	17	(0)
- * Club domestic league appearances and goals

Shamsuddin Amiri (Dari: شمس الدین امیری; born 12 February 1985) is an Afghan former footballer who played as a goalkeeper.

== Early and personal life ==
Amiri fled to Pakistan during the Taliban era, and played for Pakistan Television in Rawalpindi. His family came back in 2003 and he was subsequently selected for the Afghanistan under-19 national team.

== Club career ==
Amiri started his career at Pakistan Television. He joined Maiwand Kabul in 2003. He played for Kabul Bank from 2004 until 2009, and was equally employed with the financial institution. He later played at Ferozi from 2010 until 2011.

== International career ==
Amiri was called by the Afghanistan national under-23 team at the 2004 South Asian Games.

He subsequently received his senior call for Afghanistan at the 2005 South Asian Football Federation Gold Cup. He also featured at the 2010 FIFA World Cup qualification in 2007, 2008 AFC Challenge Cup, and the 2008 SAFF Championship.

In the June 2007 Amiri was given Afghanistan's best player of the year award at the age of only 22.
