= Solh Kabul F.C. =

Football team in Afghanistan

Solh FC
- Full name: Solh Kabul Football Club
- Ground: Kabul Stadium; Kabul, Afghanistan
- Capacity: 7,000
- League: Kabul Premier League

Solh Kabul Football Club is a football team in Afghanistan. They last played in the Kabul Premier League, the country's domestic football club league. The team also has a futsal section.

== History ==
The team played in the 2006 Kabul A Division Football League. The next year, the team featured in the inaugural 2007 Kabul Premier League.
