= Javanan Mihan Kabul FC =

Football team

Javanan Mihan FC
- Full name: Javanan Mihan Kabul Football Club
- Ground: Mihan Stadium; Kabul, Afghanistan
- Capacity: 3,000
- League: Kabul Premier League
Home colours	Away colours

Javanan Mihan Football Club (Dari: تیم فوتبال جوانان میهن) is a football team in Afghanistan. The team also has a futsal section. They last played in the Kabul Premier League, the domestic football club league in Afghanistan.

== History ==
Javanan Mihan competed in the inaugural 2007 Kabul Premier League, finishing fourth among twelve clubs. The team won four, drew five and lost two of its eleven matches, scoring eleven goals and conceding ten. The club continued in the Kabul Premier League in 2009.

By 2013, Javanan Mihan was competing in Kabul A Division Football League. It reached the promotion semi-finals but lost 5–4 to Pamir Kabul, which subsequently qualified for the following season's Kabul Premier League.

In July 2026, Javanan Mihan won Kabul A Division Football League after defeating Yuresh Bagrami 1–0 in the deciding match.
