= Javanan Azadi Kabul FC =

Javanan Azadi FC
- Full name: Javanan Azadi Kabul Football Club
- Founded: 2003
- Ground: Ghazi Stadium, Kabul, Afghanistan
- Capacity: 25,000
- League: Kabul Premier League

Javanan Azadi Football Club (Dari: تیم فوتبال جوانان آزادی) is a football team based in Kabul, Afghanistan. The club has also fielded youth and futsal teams.

== History ==
Javanan Azadi finished ninth in the inaugural 2007 Kabul Premier League. It won two, drew four and lost five of its eleven matches, scoring 12 goals, conceding 27 and earning ten points.

The club continued in Kabul Premier League in subsequent seasons.
