= Bashir Ahmad Saadat =

Afghan footballer

Personal information
- Full name: Bashir Ahmad Saadat
- Date of birth: December 27, 1981 (age 44)
- Place of birth: Kabul, Afghanistan
- Position: Defender

Team information
- Current team: Maiwand Kabul FC

Senior career*
Years	Team	Apps	(Gls)
2000–2013	Maiwand Kabul FC		

International career^{‡}
2003–2008	Afghanistan	16	(0)
- * Club domestic league appearances and goals as of January 15, 2010 ‡ National team caps and goals as of January 15, 2010

Bashir Ahmad Saadat (born December 27, 1981) is an Afghan football player. He plays as a defender and has played football with Maiwand Kabul FC since 2000.

Saadat has made sixteen appearances for Afghanistan national football team, including two qualifying matches for the 2010 FIFA World Cup.

== National team statistics ==
Afghanistan national team
Year	Apps	Goals
2003	4	0
2004		
2005		
2006		
2007	2	0
2008	1	0
2009		
2010		
Total		
