= Sabawoon Kabul FC =

Afghan football club

- Full name: Sabawoon Kabul Football Club
- Ground: Melat Stadium, Kabul, Afghanistan
- Capacity: 7,000
- League: Kabul Premier League

Sabawoon Kabul Football Club is a football team based in Kabul, Afghanistan. They play in the Kabul Premier League.

== History ==
The team competed in the inaugural 2007 Kabul Premier League.

In the 2025–26 Kabul Premier League, Sabawoon finished second with 19 points, behind Ordu on 24. Sabawoon continued to compete in the Kabul Premier League in 2026, defeating Edalat 3–1 in July.
