= 2006 Kabul A Division Football League =

Statistics of Kabul A Division Football League in season 2006.

== Overview ==
Ordu FC won the championship.

== Group A ==
Top three of group A were:

Pos	Club
1	Ordu FC
2	Hakim Sanayi Kabul F.C.
3	Shoa Kabul FC

== Group B ==
Top three of group B were:

Pos	Club
1	Kabul Bank F.C.
2	Maiwand Kabul FC
3	Solh Kabul F.C.
