= Shoa Kabul FC =

Afghan football club

- Full name: Shoa Kabul Football Club
- League: Kabul Premier League

Shoa Kabul Football Club is a football team in Afghanistan. They last played in the Kabul Premier League.

== History ==
The team played in a Kabul tournament in July 2005 involving 12 teams, used as a trial competition to select a new Kabul football team.

The team played in the 2006 Kabul A Division Football League. The next year, the team featured in the inaugural 2007 Kabul Premier League. The team competed in the Kabul Premier League and Kabul A League throughout the 2000s and 2010s. Afghan international defender Zohib Islam Amiri began his senior club career with Shoa before joining Kabul Bank.
