= 2007 Kabul Premier League =

2007 Kabul Premier League was the first season of the inaugural Kabul Premier League. 12 teams competed. Ordu FC topped in the table by winning 10 out of the 11 games played. Kabul Bank F.C. finished second, winning 9 out of the 11 games played. They lost one game while one of their matches ended in a draw.

== Overview ==
In 2007, the Afghanistan Football Federation established the Kabul Premier League as a top tier national league, consisting of the 12 top teams from the Kabul A Division Football League. Later reports indicate that the A Division Football League operated as the second tier beneath the Kabul Premier League.

== League standings ==
Pos	Clubs	Games	W	D	L	GF	GA	Pts.
1	Ordu FC	11	10	1	0	26	2	31
2	Kabul Bank F.C.	11	9	1	1	29	3	28
3	Hakim Sanayi Kabul F.C.	11	8	1	2	18	11	25
4	Javanan Mihan Kabul F.C.	11	4	5	2	11	10	17
5	Shiva Kabul F.C.	11	4	2	5	9	11	14
6	Shoa Kabul FC	11	3	3	5	16	16	12
7	Pamir Kabul FC	11	3	3	5	10	14	12
8	Maiwand Kabul F.C.	11	2	4	5	10	14	10
9	Javanan Azadi Kabul FC	11	2	4	5	12	27	10
10	Solh Kabul F.C.	11	1	6	4	7	14	9
11	Sarmiyasht Kabul F.C.	11	1	4	6	7	17	7
12	Sabawoon Kabul FC	11	0	2	9	7	23	2
