= 2008 Afghanistan National Unity Cup =

Afghanistan National Unity Cup (Persian: جام وحدت ملی افغانستان) is a football tournament that was hosted by the city of Herat in 2008. The tournament involved eight teams from across Afghanistan.

== Matches ==
=== Group stage ===
==== Group A ====
The four teams in this group were Ansari Herat F.C. and Abumoslem Herat F.C. from Herat, Mazarsharif XI from Mazar-i-Sharif and Nimruz XI from Nimruz.

- Abumoslem Herat F.C. 4–1 Nimruz XI
- Abumoslem Herat F.C. 1–1 Ansari Herat F.C.
- Abumoslem Herat F.C. 0–1 Mazarsharif XI
- Ansari Herat F.C. 3–2 Nimruz XI
- Ansari Herat F.C. 1–0 Mazarsharif XI
- Mazarsharif XI 6–1 Nimruz XI

==== Group B ====
The four teams in this group were Esteghlal Herat F.C. and Eteffaq Herat F.C. from Herat, Jalalabad XI from Jalalabad and Kabul Bank F.C. from Kabul.

- Esteghlal Herat F.C. 1–0 Kabul Bank F.C.
- Esteghlal Herat F.C. 3–1 Jalalabad XI
- Esteghlal Herat F.C. 1–0 Eteffaq Herat F.C.
- Kabul Bank F.C. 5–1 Jalalabad XI
- Kabul Bank F.C. 3–1 Eteffaq Herat F.C.
- Jalalabad XI 1–3 Eteffaq Herat F.C.

=== Semi-final ===
- Kabul Bank F.C. 1–0 Ansari Herat F.C.
- Esteghlal Herat F.C. 1–0 Mazarsharif XI

=== Third-place match ===
- Ansari Herat F.C. 4–2 Mazarsharif XI

=== Final ===
- Esteghlal Herat F.C. 1–0 Kabul Bank F.C.

== Top scorers ==
1. (Afghanistan) Jalal Afshar from Ansari Herat F.C. 5 Goals
