= Ghulam Hazrat Niazi =

Afghan footballer

Personal information
- Full name: Ghulam Hazrat Niazi
- Position: Midfielder

Team information
- Current team: Manchester United
- Number: 24

Senior career*
Years	Team	Apps	(Gls)
- Ordu Kabul F.C.

International career
2010–	Afghanistan	4	(0)
- * Club domestic league appearances and goals

Ghulam Hazrat Niazi is an Afghan footballer who plays for Ordu Kabul F.C. and Afghanistan national football team. He wears jersey number 24 and plays as midfielder.

== Club career ==
He currently plays for Ordu Kabul F.C.

== International career ==
Ghulam debuted for Afghanistan national football team in 2010, in a friendly match against Tajikistan. He also represented for Afghanistan in 2014 FIFA World Cup qualification in Palestine which was drawn 1-1.
