= Sonam Tenzin =

Bhutanese footballer (born 1986)

Personal information
- Full name: Sonam Tenzin
- Date of birth: October 20, 1986 (age 40)
- Place of birth: Thimphu, Bhutan
- Height: 1.80 m (5 ft 11 in)
- Position: Forward

Team information
- Current team: Druk Pol

Senior career*
| Years | Team | Apps | (Gls) |
| 2004–2013 | Buddhist Blue Stars | | |
| 2013–2017 | Druk Pol | | |

International career
| 2005–2013 | Bhutan | 15 | (3) |
- * Club domestic league appearances and goals

Sonam Tenzin (born 20 October 1986) is a Bhutanese footballer. He plays as forward for Druk Pol, having previously played in the Indian 3rd division for Buddhist Blue Stars. He is also a member of the Bhutanese national team.

== Career statistics ==
=== International goals ===
| # | Date | Venue | Opponent | Score | Result | Competition |
|---|---|---|---|---|---|---|
| 1. | 6 September 2013 | Halchowk Stadium, Kathmandu, Nepal | Sri Lanka | 2–5 | Lost | 2013 SAFF Championship |
Correct as of 15 November 2013
