= Balal Arezou =

Afghan footballer

Personal information
- Date of birth: 28 December 1988 (age 37)
- Place of birth: Kabul, Afghanistan
- Height: 1.80 m (5 ft 11 in)
- Position: Forward

Team information
- Current team: Grane Arendal

Youth career
- Senja
- –2006: Grane
- 2007: FK Arendal

Senior career*
Years	Team	Apps	(Gls)
2007	FK Arendal	1	(0)
2007–2008	Fredrikstad	0	(0)
2009–2015	Asker	118	(24)
2013–2014	→ Churchill Brothers (loan)	8	(0)
2015–2016	Moss	20	(9)
2016–2018	Asker	2	(0)
2018	Arendal	6	(1)
2019–2024	IF Trauma	44	(28)
2024–	Grane Arendal	18	(12)

International career^{‡}
2010	Afghanistan U23	5	(6)
2011–	Afghanistan	28	(9)
Medal record
Men's football
Representing Afghanistan
SAFF Championship
Winner	2013 Nepal
- * Club domestic league appearances and goals as of 10 February 2025 ‡ National team caps and goals as of 16 November 2023

Balal Arezou (also Belal or Bilal; born 28 December 1988) is an Afghan footballer who plays as a forward and currently plays for Norwegian club Grane Arendal. He ranks second in the all-time top scorers table of the Afghanistan national football team with nine goals.

== Club career ==
=== Asker ===
Arezou grew up in Afghanistan and moved to Norway as a refugee. In Norway, he played football for Senja, IK Grane|Grane, Arendal and Fredrikstad's youth team before he joined Asker in 2009.

=== Churchill Brothers ===
In February 2013 he joined Churchill Brothers S.C. on a four-month loan from Asker. His move completed with the return of Indian striker Sunil Chhetri from Sporting Clube de Portugal.

=== Moss FK ===
On 7 March 2015 he joined Moss FK on a 2-year contract. He will wear shirt number 90.

=== IF Trauma ===
Arezou signed with IF Trauma on 26 January 2019, and was reunited with his former coach, Gaute Haugenes.

== International career ==
Arezou was included in Afghanistan's squad for the 2014 AFC Challenge Cup in the Maldives. In the group stages of the tournament Afghanistan claimed their first ever win at the AFC Challenge Cup with a 3–1 victory over Turkmenistan. After Afghanistan's 0–0 draw with Laos that confirmed their progression out of the group stage, an accident occurred while the Afghan players were being driven back to their hotel. Arezou sustained minor injuries in the accident along with his teammates Faisal Sakhizada, Ahmad Hatifi, Zohib Islam Amiri, and Mustafa Azadzoy. All five players were set to miss the semi-finals against Palestine. Former coach Mohammad Yousef Kargar and current coach Erich Rutemöller also suffered minor injuries.

=== International goals ===
Scores and results list Afghanistan's goal tally first.

#	Date	Venue	Opponent	Score	Result	Competition
1.	3 July 2011	Faisal Al-Husseini International Stadium, Al-Ram, Palestine	Palestine	1–1	1–1	2014 FIFA World Cup qualifier
2.	3 December 2011	Jawaharlal Nehru Stadium, New Delhi, India	India	1–0	1–1	2011 SAFF Championship
3.	7 December 2011	Jawaharlal Nehru Stadium, New Delhi, India	Bhutan	3–0	8–1	2011 SAFF Championship
4.	7 December 2011	Jawaharlal Nehru Stadium, New Delhi, India	Bhutan	4–0	8–1	2011 SAFF Championship
5.	7 December 2011	Jawaharlal Nehru Stadium, New Delhi, India	Bhutan	5–1	8–1	2011 SAFF Championship
6.	7 December 2011	Jawaharlal Nehru Stadium, New Delhi, India	Bhutan	8–1	8–1	2011 SAFF Championship
7.	9 December 2011	Jawaharlal Nehru Stadium, New Delhi, India	Nepal	1–0	1–0	2011 SAFF Championship
8.	2 March 2013	New Laos National Stadium, Vientiane, Laos	Sri Lanka	1–0	1–0	2014 AFC Challenge Cup qualifier
9.	4 March 2013	New Laos National Stadium, Vientiane, Laos	Mongolia	1–0	1–0	2014 AFC Challenge Cup qualifier

== Personal life ==
Balal's younger brother Amid Arezou made his debut for the Afghanistan national team in 2024.

== Career statistics ==
=== Club ===
As of 16 August 2014

Season	Club	League	League		Cup		Continental		Total	
Season	Club	League	Apps	Goals	Apps	Goals	Apps	Goals	Apps	Goals
2009	Asker	2. divisjon	25	4	0	0	—		25	4
2010	Asker	2. divisjon	26	7	2	2	—		28	9
2011	Asker	Adeccoligaen	19	0	0	0	—		19	0
2012	Asker	2. divisjon	24	10	2	0	—		26	10
2012–13	Churchill Brothers (loan)	I-League	8	0	0	0	4	0	12	0
2013	Asker	2. divisjon	7	1	0	0	—		7	1
2014–15	Asker	2. divisjon	17	2	1	0	—		18	2
Asker total			118	24	5	2	—		123	26
Career total			126	24	5	2	4	0	135	26

== Honors ==
Churchill Brothers

- I-League 2013

Afghanistan

- 2013 SAFF Championship

Individual

- 2010 South Asian Games Top Scorer
