= Zohib Islam Amiri =

Afghan footballer

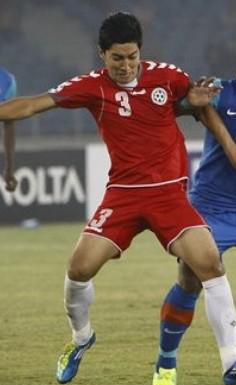
- Amiri with Afghanistan in 2011

Personal information
- Full name: Zohib Islam Haroon Fakhruddin Amiri
- Date of birth: 15 February 1990 (age 36)
- Place of birth: Kabul, Republic of Afghanistan
- Height: 1.77 m (5 ft 10 in)
- Position: Centre-back

Youth career
- 2002–2005: Aga Khan Sports Academy

Senior career*
Years	Team	Apps	(Gls)
2005–2007	Shoa Kabul FC	20	(5)
2007–2009	Kabul Bank	50	(7)
2009–2011	Ferozi	20	(4)
2011–2014	Mumbai	58	(9)
2014–2015	Dempo	16	(5)
2014	→ FC Goa (loan)	9	(0)
2015–2016	DSK Shivajians	14	(0)
2017	Chennai City FC	10	(2)
2018–2019	New Radiant	15	(2)
2019	A.S. Blainville	0	(0)
2019–2020	Gokulam Kerala	12	(0)
2020–2021	A.S. Blainville	21	(1)
2021	Real Kashmir	14	(0)
2022–2024	A.S. Blainville	31	(5)
2024–2025	Abu Muslim		
Total		270	(40)

International career
2005–2024	Afghanistan	71	(6)
Medal record
Men's football
Representing Afghanistan
SAFF Championship
Winner	2013 Nepal
- * Club domestic league appearances and goals

Zohib Islam Haroon Fakhruddin Amiri (Dari: ذهیب اسلام هارون فخرالدین امیری; born 15 February 1990) is an Afghan former professional footballer who played as a centre-back. Over his two-decade career, he became a pivotal figure in Afghan football, representing clubs across Asia and North America while captaining the Afghanistan national team. Known for his defensive resilience and leadership, Amiri earned 71 caps and scored six goals for his country. He captained Afghanistan to their historic 2013 SAFF Championship victory, solidifying his legacy as one of Afghanistan's most iconic footballers.

== Early life ==
Amiri was born on 15 February 1990 to an ethnic Hazara family in Kabul, with his family originally hailing from Bamyan. Growing up he played football often on the streets of Char Qala in eastern Kabul, using a homemade ball made of rolled up fabric stitched together. During the Taliban rule he often witnessed executions at the national stadium.

After rising tensions in Kabul, Amiri's family moved to Karachi in Pakistan as refugees, where he eventually joined an amateur team at the age of twelve at the Agha Khan Sports Academy, along with his elder brothers, as a striker. After Hamid Karzai took over as president of Afghanistan, his family returned to Afghanistan in March 2005 for a cousin's wedding, joining a local club named Shoa Kabul FC.

== Club career ==
=== Early career ===
After playing for Shoa Kabul FC, he played for Kabul Bank from 2007 until 2009, which provided financial stability to players during the war in Afghanistan. He later played at Ferozi from 2009 until 2011.

=== Mumbai FC ===
Amiri joined Mumbai FC in 2011, and quickly became one of the star players at the club. Following his impressive performances during the 2012–13 I-League he received the award for the fan's players on the season. Despite reviving this prestigious award his contract with Mumbai FC was not renewed and Amiri began thinking of moving to Bahrain or Oman to play club football, but ultimately decided to stay in India.

=== Dempo SC ===
On 11 January, Amiri along with Tolgay Özbey signed for Indian club Dempo on a one-year contract, and received shirt number 18. He made his debut against Rangdajied United and scored. On 7 April he was involved in an ugly brawl in a match between Dempo SC and his former club Mumbai FC.

On 30 May both Amiri and Özbey signed extensions with Dempo.

On 4 April 2015, he scored two goals, including one only one minute from time to salvage a 2–2 draw with Sporting Goa.

=== DSK Shivajians ===
In January 2016, Amiri announced signing a contract with Indian football club DSK Shivajians. He finished the season with DSK Shivajians last but did not relegate with his team because other clubs withdraw from the league.

=== Chennai City ===
In January 2017, Amiri joined Chennai City FC in the Indian I-League. He left after disagreement with the coach.

=== New Radiant ===
In January 2018, Amiri signed for Maldivian club New Radiant, which played at the top tier Dhivehi Premier League.

=== Blainville ===
In 2019, he briefly played with A.S. Blainville in the Canadian Première ligue de soccer du Québec, playing in cup matches, earning a red card in one.

=== Gokulam Kerala ===
On 2 November 2019, it was announced that Amiri joined Gokulam Kerala for 2019 i league.

=== Return to Blainville ===
Amiri also played with Blainville in the 2020 and 2021 seasons.

=== Real Kashmir ===
"I have had offers from the middle east, and also parts of Asia. But I never wanted to come out of my comfort zone. I have already settled down in India, and whichever city I play in, I cherish it. Going to another country will require myself to devote time to learn the language, culture, adapt to the food and a lot of other stuff – there will always be new challenges.

I am aware of the Indian culture, celebrate Indian festivals, love the food, speak the same language, watch the movies, hang around with my Indian friends, and am extremely proud of having been in India. I am welcomed everywhere and have been lucky to have made good buddies over the years."

— Amiri on his career in India after signing with Real Kashmir.

In 2021, ahead of the 2021–22 I-League season, Amiri joined Real Kashmir. He also appeared with the club in 2021 IFA Shield.

=== Later career ===
Amiri made his third return to Blainville in 2021, playing for the club until 2024. He lastly returned to his home country, joining Afghanistan Champions League club Abu Muslim in October 2024, helping the side to clinch the 2024–25 season title. Amiri officially announced his retirement from football at the end of the season, after a controversial 8–0 victory against Adalat Farah which secured the league title for his team at the end of the competition amid allegations of match-fixing.

== International career ==
Amiri made his debut in the 2005 SAFF Gold Cup against Maldives. He was part of the Afghanistan squad for the 2011 SAFF Championship, where they reached the final for the first time. Wearing number 3 he contributed many memorable performances, including scoring one of the goals in Afghanistan's biggest ever victory over Bhutan.

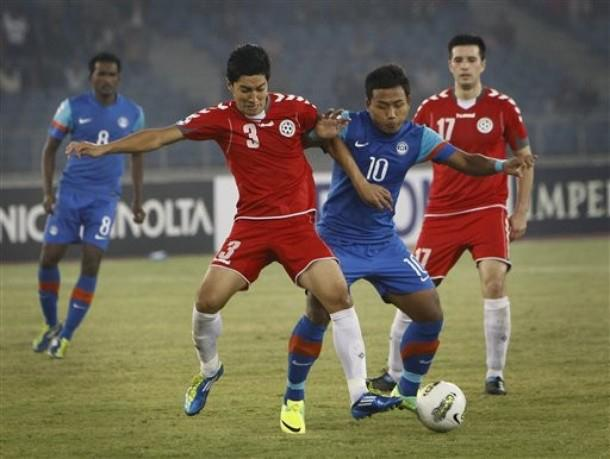
Amiri (in red uniform) against Jeje Lalpekhlua of India during the 2011 SAFF Championship

Two years later Amiri served as captain for Afghanistan at the 2013 SAFF Championship, and was the rock of which the Afghan defense was built on. He scored goals in a 3–0 win over Bhutan and a 3–1 win over Sri Lanka. He played a crucial role as Afghanistan made it to the final for a second consecutive time an achieved a 2–0 victory against India.

In May 2014 Amiri captained the squad to the 2014 AFC Challenge Cup in the Maldives. On 22 May he scored the first goal of the game with a bullet header in Afghanistan's 3–1 victory over Turkmenistan at the 2014 AFC Challenge Cup. This was also Afghanistan's first every victory at the AFC Challenge Cup in eight attempts. After Afghanistan's 0–0 draw with Laos that confirmed their progression out of the group stage, an accident occurred while the Afghan players were being driven back to their hotel. Amiri suffered minor injuries, along with Faisal Sakhizada, Ahmad Hatifi, Balal Arezou, and Mustafa Azadzoy, the latter of which will have to take three weeks off to recover, missing the semi-finals against Palestine. Former coach Mohammad Yousef Kargar and current coach Erich Rutemöller also suffered minor injuries.

== Career statistics ==
=== International ===
Appearances and goals by national team and year
National team	Year	Apps	Goals
Afghanistan	2006	1	0
Afghanistan	2007	2	0
Afghanistan	2008	8	0
Afghanistan	2009	3	0
Afghanistan	2010	1	0
Afghanistan	2011	12	1
Afghanistan	2013	9	2
Afghanistan	2014	8	2
Afghanistan	2017	4	1
Afghanistan	2018	3	0
Afghanistan	2019	7	0
Afghanistan	2021	5	0
Afghanistan	2022	3	0
Afghanistan	2023	1	0
Afghanistan	2024	4	0
Total		71	6

Scores and results list Afghanistan's goal tally first, score column indicates score after each Amiri goal.

List of international goals scored by Zohib Islam Amiri
No.	Date	Venue	Opponent	Score	Result	Competition
1	7 December 2011	Jawaharlal Nehru Stadium, New Delhi, India	Bhutan	2–0	8–1	2011 SAFF Championship
2	2 September 2013	Halchowk Stadium, Kathmandu, Nepal	Bhutan	1–0	3–0	2013 SAFF Championship
3	4 September 2013	Halchowk Stadium, Kathmandu, Nepal	Sri Lanka	2–1	3–1	2013 SAFF Championship
4	14 May 2014	Al Kuwait Sports Club Stadium, Kuwait City, Kuwait	Kuwait	1–3	2–3	Friendly
5	22 May 2014	Addu Football Stadium, Addu City, Maldives	Turkmenistan	1–0	3–1	2014 AFC Challenge Cup
6	10 October 2017	Pamir Stadium, Dushanbe, Tajikistan	Jordan	2–2	3–3	2019 AFC Asian Cup qualification

== Honours ==
Afghanistan

- SAFF Championship: 2013

Real Kashmir

- IFA Shield: 2021
