= Mohamed Kabia =

Sierra Leonean footballer

Personal information
- Full name: Mohamed Kabia
- Date of birth: 4 October 1988 (age 38)
- Place of birth: Sierra Leone
- Height: 1.85 m (6 ft 1 in)
- Position: Forward

Senior career*
| Years | Team | Apps | (Gls) |
| 2009–2010 | East End Lions | | |
| 2010–2011 | Stade Tunisien | 6 | (1) |
| 2011 | Motala AIF | 2 | (0) |
| 2011–2012 | Syrianska FC | 2 | (0) |

International career^{‡}
| 2011– | Sierra Leone | 2 | (1) |
- * Club domestic league appearances and goals as of 4 June 2012 ‡ National team caps and goals as of 4 June 2012

Mohamed Kabia (born 4 October 1988) is a Sierra Leonean footballer who plays as a forward.
