= Ariana Kabul FC =

Afghan football club

Ariana
- Full name: Ariana Kabul Football Club
- Founded: 1941; 85 years ago
- Ground: Ghazi Stadium; Kabul
- Capacity: 25,000
- League: Kabul A Division Football League

Ariana Kabul Football Club (Dari: کلب آریانا) is a football team in Afghanistan. The club was founded in 1941.

The club used to be the most successful in Afghanistan, having won the Kabul A Division Football League in a streak from 1946 to 1955.

== History ==
Founded in 1941, it is generally regarded as Afghanistan's second formally organised football club after Mahmoudiyeh.

Ariana was closely associated with the development of Afghanistan's early national team. Reports connect the club's players with the Afghanistan Independence football tournament hosted in Kabul in August 1941. The team played two matches, a 3–1 loss to India and a 0–0 draw with Iran. Later accounts state that Ariana's squad represented Afghanistan in the event, although the precise relationship between the club and the national selection is not fully documented.

Ariana dominated the early Kabul A Division Football League. After the competition was established in 1946, the club won ten consecutive championships from 1946 through 1955.

In 1949, Ariana toured Tehran at the invitation of Iranian authorities. It played three matches, winning one and losing two.

== Achievements ==
=== Kabul A Division Football League ===
- Winners (10): 1946, 1947, 1948, 1949, 1950, 1951, 1952, 1953, 1954, 1955
