= Sushilkumar Singh Chongtham =

Indian footballer (born 1981)

Sushil Kumar Singh
Personal information
- Full name: Sushilkumar Singh Chongtham
- Date of birth: 1 April 1981 (age 45)
- Place of birth: Manipur, India
- Height: 1.79 m (5 ft 10 1/2 in)
- Position: Forward

Team information
- Current team: NEROCA F.C.
- Number: 14

Youth career
- 2005–2007: Mohun Bagan

Senior career*
Years	Team	Apps	(Gls)
2007–2010	Mahindra United	16	(8)
2010–2011	East Bengal	5	(1)
2011–2012	United Sikkim	0	(0)
2012–2013	Shillong Lajong	29	(6)
2013–2014	Eagles	0	(0)
2014	Mumbai City FC	5	(1)
2015	→ Dempo (loan)	8	(1)
2015	Atlético de Kolkata	5	(0)
2016	Mumbai F.C.	11	(4)
2016–2018	NEROCA		

International career^{‡}
2007–2012	India U23	5	(2)
2008–2012	India	27	(3)
- * Club domestic league appearances and goals as of 15:28, 5 March 2016 (UTC) ‡ National team caps and goals as of 09:07, 7 April 2015 (UTC)

Sushilkumar Singh Chongtham (Meitei: Chongtham Sushilkumar Singh, born 1 April 1981), also simply known as Sushil Kumar Singh, is an Indian footballer. He last played for NEROCA in Manipur State League.

== Club career ==
=== Mahindra United ===
Singh started his footballing career at Mahindra United in the I-League and scored eight goals in eleven games while with Mahindra till Mahindra disbanded.

=== East Bengal ===
After Mahindra United disbanded Singh joined another I-League club. This time it was Kingfisher East Bengal F.C. During his first season with East Bengal in 2010-11 Singh played in five games and scored one goal.

=== United Sikkim ===
In July 2011 it was reported that United Sikkim F.C. of the I-League 2nd Division have signed Singh on a one-year contract after Singh talked with Baichung Bhutia.

=== Shillong Lajong ===
On 25 January 2012 it was announced that Kumar Singh has signed back into the I-League with Shillong Lajong.

=== Atlético de Kolkata ===
Signalling his steady decline in match-readiness and age, in July 2015, Singh was drafted to play for Atlético de Kolkata in the 2015 Indian Super League, being ineligible for any of the auctions.

=== Mumbai FC ===
He has been signed on by the thrifty Mumbai FC for the I-League2015-16 season where he is on loan from Atletico de Kolkata. He is seen as the fallback forward in the club featuring a few prominent Japanese players. While, his and the club's performance for most of the season has been lacklustre, he has managed to score 4 goals during appearances which did not feature the primary scorer for a team which has been plagued with injuries.

=== NEROCA FC ===
He has been signed on by the NEROCA FC from Manipur and scheduled to play in the 2016-17 Durand Cup in Delhi. This is club participates 2-steps below the divisions of the leagues that he has been participating in the last couple of years. While, the club made it to a historic final on its debut at the Durand Cup 2016 riding on the effort of the young manipuri team, the team lost the trophy in penalties to Army Green when Sushil hit a ground sitter to the opposite goalkeeper.

== International career ==
Sushil has represented the India national football team on multiple occasions. In 2009, he led the India U-23 team to the 2009 SAFF Championship where he scored from a free kick against Bangladesh to help India go into the finals and face Maldives. Sushil scored his third goal for India's seniors against Qatar in India's historic 2–1 victory away from home.

Singh was then selected by India for the 2011 SAFF Championship in which he played in two matches, including the final and scored one goal which came in the final which India won 4–0 over Afghanistan on 11 December 2011.

== Honours ==
India

- AFC Challenge Cup: 2008
- SAFF Championship: 2011; runner-up: 2008
- Nehru Cup: 2009

India U23

- SAFF Championship: 2009
