= Kandahar Aryan =

Afghan football club

- Full name: Kandahar Aryan
- League: Afghan National League (formerly)
Home colours	Away colours

Kandahar Aryan Football Club is an association football club based in Kandahar, Afghanistan. In September 2005, it played first international friendly match against Shaheed Azizullah, a team from the Balochistan region of Pakistan.
