= Ata Yamrali =

German-Afghan footballer

Personal information
- Full name: Ata Mohammed Yamrali
- Date of birth: 5 July 1982 (age 44)
- Place of birth: Kabul, Afghanistan
- Height: 1.90 m (6 ft 3 in)
- Position: Attacking midfielder

Youth career
- SC Poppenbüttel
- Hamburger SV
- TSV Sasel

Senior career*
Years	Team	Apps	(Gls)
2000–2001	TSV Sasel		
2001–2002	SC Victoria Hamburg	13	(2)
2002–2003	Holstein Quickborn	19	(1)
2003–2005	TSV Sasel	47	(4)
2005–2007	FC St. Pauli II	55	(10)
2007–2008	ASV Bergedorf	9	(1)
2008–2009	Niendorfer TSV	29	(5)
2009–2010	Wedeler TSV	33	(5)
2010–2012	TSV Sasel		
2012–2014	VfL 93 Hamburg		
2014–2015	SV Uhlenhorst-Adler		
2015–2016	SC Poppenbüttel		
2016–2020	SC Alstertal/Langenhorn	21	(3)
2020–2022	SC Poppenbüttel	18	(7)

International career
2007–2013	Afghanistan	12	(3)
- * Club domestic league appearances and goals

Ata Yamrali (born 5 July 1982) is a German-Afghan former footballer who played as an attacking midfielder. Between 2007 and 2013 he made 12 appearances for the Afghanistan national team, scoring 3 goals.

== Early life ==
Yamrali was born in Kabul. In 1985, when Yamrali was three years old and the Soviet army invaded Afghanistan, his family fled from Kabul to Gumbat, Iran. Three years later, they moved to Hamburg, Germany.

== Club career ==
Yamrali started playing club football at the age of 11, for SC Poppenbüttel and also played youth football for Hamburger SV and TSV Sasel. Having a suffered a shin fracture in May 2001, he had become a regular starter for SC Victoria Hamburg, playing in the fifth-tier Verbandsliga Hamburg, by November.

== International career ==
Yamrali scored his first international goal for Afghanistan in 2008 AFC Challenge Cup qualifiers against the hosts Kyrgyzstan, to ensure Afghanistan qualified for the finals. He was a member of the Afghanistan national team and appeared in two 2010 FIFA World Cup qualifying matches.

== Career statistics ==
=== Club ===
Appearances and goals by club, season and competition
Club	Season	League		
Club	Season	Division	Apps	Goals
TSV Sasel	2000–01			
SC Victoria Hamburg	2001–02	Verbandsliga Hamburg	13	2
Holstein Quickborn	2002–03	Landesliga Hamburg-Hammonia	19	1
TSV Sasel	2003–04	Oberliga Hamburg	27	4
TSV Sasel	2004–05	Oberliga Hamburg	20	0
TSV Sasel	Total		47	4
FC St. Pauli II	2005–06	Oberliga Nord	30	4
FC St. Pauli II	2006–07	Oberliga Nord	26	6
FC St. Pauli II	Total		56	10
ASV Bergedorf	2007–08	Oberliga Nord	9	1
Niendorfer TSV	2008–09	Oberliga Hamburg	29	5
Wedeler TSV	2009–10	Oberliga Hamburg	33	5
TSV Sasel	2010–11	Landesliga Hamburg-Hansa		
TSV Sasel	2011–12	Oberliga Hamburg	33	1
TSV Sasel	Total			
VfL 93 Hamburg	2012–13			
VfL 93 Hamburg	2013–14			
VfL 93 Hamburg	Total			
SV Uhlenhorst-Adler	2014–15			
SC Poppenbüttel	2014–15			
SC Poppenbüttel	2015–16		2	1
SC Poppenbüttel	Total			
SC Alstertal/Langenhorn	2016–17		6	1
SC Alstertal/Langenhorn	2017–18		5	1
SC Alstertal/Langenhorn	2018–19		10	1
SC Alstertal/Langenhorn	2019–20		0	0
SC Alstertal/Langenhorn	Total		21	3
SC Poppenbüttel	2020–21		3	2
SC Poppenbüttel	2021–22		15	5
SC Poppenbüttel	Total		18	7
Career total				

=== International ===
Scores and results list Afghanistan's goal tally first, score column indicates score after each Yamrali goal.

List of international goals scored by Ata Yamrali
No.	Date	Venue	Opponent	Score	Result	Competition
1	7 May 2008	Bishkek, Kyrgyzstan	Kyrgyzstan	1–0	1–0	2008 AFC Challenge Cup
2	5 December 2011	New Delhi, India	Sri Lanka	3–1	3–1	2011 SAFF Championship
3	7 December 2011	New Delhi, India	Bhutan	1–0	8–1	2011 SAFF Championship
