= Seramiasht FC =

Afghan football club

Seramiasht
- Full name: Seramiasht Football Club
- Founded: 1995; 31 years ago
- Ground: Kabul Stadium; Kabul
- Capacity: 25,000
- Chairman: Zahir Walizada
- Manager: Muhammad Zulmai
- League: Kabul Premier League

Seramiasht Football Club is a football team from Kabul, Afghanistan. The club competes in the Kabul Premier League. The team is associated with the Afghan Red Crescent Society.

== History ==
In 2003, the team won the Kabul A Division Football League. The team also competed in the inaugural 2007 Kabul Premier League.

In 2016, Seramiasht won the Kabul Premier League with 29 points. The competition was played over approximately three months at Ghazi Stadium.

Seramiasht won the Kabul Football League in 2017, finishing first in a 13-team competition that lasted approximately three months.
