= Ferozi FC =

Afghan football club

Ferozi
- Sponsorship logo
- Full name: Ferozi Football Club
- Founded: 2004
- Ground: Kabul Stadium, Kabul
- Capacity: 25,000
- League: Kabul Premier League

Ferozi Football Club, formerly known as Kabul Bank FC is a football club based in Afghanistan. They last competed in the Kabul Premier League.

== History ==
In its initial years as Kabul Bank FC, the team was supported by Kabul Bank and employed it's players with the financial institution.

In 2006, Kabul Bank competed in the Kabul A Division Football League. The team finished runner-up in the inaugural 2007 Kabul Premier League. It won nine, drew one and lost one of its eleven matches, scoring 23 goals and conceding five, and finished three points behind champions Ordu. Kabul Bank won the Kabul Premier League in 2009.

By the following season, the club had adopted the name Ferozi, and won the 2010 Kabul Premier League. They won it again in 2012.

In 2013, Ferozi reached the final of the Kabul Premier League. It drew 1–1 with Setara Azadi in the semi-final before winning the penalty shootout 3–1. Ferozi then finished runner-up to Big Bear.

The club remained active in the Kabul Premier League in 2016, finishing third with 25 points behind Seramiasht and Ordu.

Several Afghanistan internationals were associated with Kabul Bank and Ferozi, including Zohib Islam Amiri, Israfeel Kohistani, Hashmatullah Barakzai and Muqadar Qazizada. American player Nicholas Pugliese also played for Ferozi during the 2013–14 period.

== Achievements ==
- Kabul Premier League
  - Champions (2): 2009, 2010, 2012
  - Runners-up (2): 2007, 2013
- Afghanistan National Unity Cup
  - Runners-up (1): 2008
- Kabul Cup
  - Champions (1): 2013
