= Trịnh Quang Vinh =

Vietnamese footballer

Personal information
- Full name: Trịnh Quang Vinh
- Date of birth: March 17, 1988 (age 38)
- Place of birth: Hanoi, Vietnam
- Height: 1.72 m (5 ft 8 in)
- Position: Forward

Youth career
- 2001–2006: Thể Công

Senior career*
| Years | Team | Apps | (Gls) |
| 2007–2009 | Thể Công | 75 | (24) |
| 2010–2011 | FLC Thanh Hóa | 20 | (2) |
| 2012–2017 | Becamex Bình Dương | 83 | (13) |
| 2017 | Hồ Chí Minh City | 6 | (0) |
| 2018 | FLC Thanh Hóa | 2 | (0) |
| 2018–2019 | Sài Gòn | 3 | (2) |
| 2020–2021 | Phố Hiến | 21 | (6) |
- * Club domestic league appearances and goals as of 23 October 2019

Trịnh Quang Vinh (born 17 March 1988) is a Vietnamese footballer who plays as a forward for V.League 2 club Phố Hiến

== Honours ==
=== Club ===
Becamex Bình Dương

- V.League 1: 2014, 2015
- Vietnamese National Cup: 2015
- Vietnamese Super Cup: 2014, 2015

=== Individual ===
- V.League 2 top scorer: 2007
