= Mohammad Mashriqi =

American-born Afghan footballer

Personal information
- Full name: Mohammad Yusef Mashriqi
- Date of birth: 7 July 1987 (age 39)
- Place of birth: New York City, United States
- Height: 1.88 m (6 ft 2 in)
- Position: Midfielder

Youth career
- 1995–1996: Blau Weiss Gottschee
- 2005–2008: Long Island Blackbirds
- 2008–: New York Red Bulls

Senior career*
Years	Team	Apps	(Gls)
2006–2007	Bakersfield Brigade	5	(0)
2009	Brooklyn Knights	7	(1)
2010	Jersey Express S.C.		
2011–2013	Brishna F.C.		
2013–2014	Bhawanipore F.C.		
2015	United Cyclones Soccer Club		

International career^{‡}
2001	United States U15		
2011–2016	Afghanistan	30	(2)
Medal record
Men's football
Representing Afghanistan
SAFF Championship
Winner	2013 Nepal
- * Club domestic league appearances and goals as of February 1, 2016 ‡ National team caps and goals as of February 1, 2016

Mohammad Yusef Mashriqi (born 7 July 1987) is a professional footballer who plays as a midfielder. Born in the United States, he played for the Afghanistan national team.

== Early life ==
Mashriqi's soccer lineage started with his father, Tahir, a former member of the Afghanistan national team. When communists took control of his country during the 10-year Afghanistan War, soccer took a back seat to survival for Tahir and his wife, Safora, and their son Sabir and daughter, Sabira, who were 5 and 3 at the time. Tahir took his family and fled to Pakistan. They reached the U.S. Embassy, and in 1985 they were safely in the United States. After settling in the Flushing, New York area, Mohammad was born two years later, in 1987.

== Career ==
=== Youth and college ===
Mashriqi attended Flushing High School and from the age of nine played for the famed Blau Weiss Gottschee club in New York, winning four State Cup championships. He was a member of his regional ODP from 2001 to 2005, and played for the Brooklyn Knights in the USL Super-Y League, helping them reach the national semifinals. He played four years of college soccer at Long Island University.

During his college years, Mashriqi also played in the USL Premier Development League for Bakersfield Brigade in 2006 and 2007, and with the Brooklyn Knights in 2009.

Mashriqi trained with the Under-17 squad of prestigious club Paris Saint-Germain, and with the New York Red Bulls of Major League Soccer during their 2008 pre-season. Mashriqi is currently a part of the reserve squad for New York Red Bulls which plays in the MLS Reserve Division, while simultaneously playing for New York-area amateur team Brishna F.C.

=== International ===
Mashriqi was a member of the U.S. Under-14 National Team, but switched his international allegiance to his father's country, Afghanistan in 2010.

He played in both of Afghanistan's qualifying games for the 2014 FIFA World Cup against Palestine in July 2011, and scored his first international goal for Afghanistan in its 8–1 victory over Bhutan in the quarter-finals of the 2011 SAFF Championship on December 7, 2011.

After being absent for almost 2 years Mashriqi was called up for the friendly match against Malaysia in October 2016.

== Career statistics ==
=== International ===
Appearances and goals by national team and year
National team	Year	Apps	Goals
Afghanistan	2011	12	1
Afghanistan	2012	–	
Afghanistan	2013	9	0
Afghanistan	2014	9	1
Total		30	2

Scores and results list Afghanistan's goal tally first, score column indicates score after each Mashriqi goal.

List of international goals scored by Mohammed Mashriqi
No.	Date	Venue	Opponent	Score	Result	Competition
1	7 December 2011	Jawaharlal Nehru Stadium, New Delhi, India	Bhutan	7–1	8–1	2011 SAFF Championship
2	12 May 2014	Al Kuwait Sports Club Stadium, Kuwait City, Kuwait	Kyrgyzstan	1–0	1–0	Friendly

== Honours ==
Afghanistan

- SAFF Championship: 2013
