= Real Afghan Kabul =

Afghan football club

- Full name: Real Afghan Kabul
- Founded: 2003; 23 years ago

Real Afghan Kabul is a football team in Afghanistan. It was founded in 2003.
