= Sandjar Ahmadi =

Afghan footballer (born 1992)

Personal information
- Date of birth: 10 February 1992 (age 34)
- Place of birth: Kabul, Republic of Afghanistan
- Height: 1.78 m (5 ft 10 in)
- Positions: Winger; striker

Team information
- Current team: Hamm United FC
- Number: 7

Youth career
- SV Nettelnburg/Allermöhe
- SC Concordia Hamburg

Senior career*
Years	Team	Apps	(Gls)
2011–2013	SC Vier- und Marschlande	52	(7)
2013–2014	Mumbai	9	(2)
2014–2015	SC Vier- und Marschlande	23	(3)
2015–	Hamm United FC	0	(0)

International career^{‡}
2011–	Afghanistan	25	(6)
Medal record
Men's football
Representing Afghanistan
SAFF Championship
Winner	2013 Nepal
- * Club domestic league appearances and goals as of 7 June 2014 ‡ National team caps and goals as of 7 June 2014

Sandjar Ahmadi (Dari: سنجر احمدی) is a footballer from Afghanistan who currently plays for Hamm United FC and the Afghanistan national football team. He scored two goals against Sri Lanka in 2011 SAFF Championship, helping the national team win 3–1. Ahmadi scored the winning goal against Laos in the AFC Challenge Cup qualifiers. He scored against Pakistan in a friendly on 20 August 2013. He scored the winning goal against Nepal in the 2013 SAFF Championship to take his nation to the finals. In the final, he scored the winning goal, beating India to earn his country's first ever FIFA tournament win. The team was also granted US$50,000 for being the champions. In an interview with Afghanistan's captain Zohib Islam Amiri, Amiri said "He is a great player, and we couldn't have won this without him."

== Early life ==
Sandjar Ahmadi was born in Kabul, Afghanistan and then with his family he moved to Germany and now lives in Hamburg. He was seven years only when he started playing football. Now he plays for both club and country on the international level.

== Club career ==
Ahmadi plays for SC Vier- und Marschlande in Oberliga Hamburg. He wears number 12. He is a winger but he also can play as a central forward.

=== Mumbai FC ===
Sandjar Ahmadi has scored 2 goals in 9 matches for Mumbai FC in I-League. In an interview, he revealed that he was targeting highest position in I-League with Mumbai FC.

== Club career stats ==
Last update: 14 May 2013

Club performance			League		Cup		League Cup		Continental		Total	
Season	Club	League	Apps	Goals	Apps	Goals	Apps	Goals	Apps	Goals	Apps	Goals
Germany			League		DFB-Pokal		Other		Europe		Total	
2011–12	SC Vier- und Marschlande	Oberliga Hamburg	29	3	-		-		-		29	3
2012–13	SC Vier- und Marschlande	Oberliga Hamburg	23	4	-		-		-		23	4
Total	Country		52	7	-		-		-		52	7
Career total			52	7	-		-		-		52	7

== International goals ==
Scores and results list Afghanistan's goal tally first.

#	Date	Venue	Opponent	Score	Result	Competition
1.	5 December 2011	Jawaharlal Nehru Stadium, Delhi, New Delhi	Sri Lanka	1–1	3–1	2011 SAFF Championship
2.	5 December 2011	Jawaharlal Nehru Stadium, Delhi, New Delhi	Sri Lanka	2–1	3–1	2011 SAFF Championship
3.	6 March 2013	New Laos National Stadium, Vientiane	Laos	1–1	1–1	2014 AFC Challenge Cup qualification
4.	20 August 2013	Afghanistan Football Federation Stadium, Kabul	Pakistan	1–0	3–0	International Friendly
5.	8 September 2013	Dasarath Rangasala Stadium, Kathmandu	Nepal	1–0	1–0	2013 SAFF Championship
6.	11 September 2013	Dasarath Rangasala Stadium, Kathmandu	India	2–0	2–0	2013 SAFF Championship

== Honours ==
Afghanistan

- SAFF Championship: 2013
