= Maiwand Kabul F.C. =

Afghan football club

Maiwand SC
- Full name: Maiwand Sports Club
- Founded: 1969; 57 years ago
- Ground: Kabul Stadium; Kabul
- Capacity: 25,000
- Chairman: Haji Muhammad Ibrahim
- Manager: Sayed Zia Mazafari
- League: Kabul Premier League
Home colours	Away colours

Maiwand Kabul Football Club (Dari: باشگاه فوتبال میوند) is a football team based in Afghanistan, last playing in the Kabul Premier League. The club is a cultural and sporting organisation, active in wrestling, taekwondo, futsal and football. It also has youth teams.

== History ==
The organisation was founded in 1348 SH (1969–70) in Chindawol, Kabul. It was initially known as Nowbahar Football Club. In the year 1355 SH (1976–77) with the agreement of high authorities of that time Maiwand club changed to Maiwand football team.

The team won the second level Kabul B Division Football League in 1357 SH (1978–79), entered the top Kabul A Division Football League the following season, and won the league title in 1376 SH (1997–98). The team also recorded victories in the Maiwand Cup, Peace Cup and Independence Cup during the period.

In June 2006, Maiwand was listed second in Group B of the Kabul A Division Football League behind Kabul Bank. The next year the team competed in the inaugural 2007 Kabul Premier League.
