= Kabul A Division Football League =

- Founded: 1946; 80 years ago
- Country: Afghanistan
- Level on pyramid: 3 (overall)
- Promotion to: Kabul Premier League
- Most championships: Ariana Kabul FC (10 titles)

The Kabul A Division Football League serves as the second tier provincial football league of Kabul, beneath the Kabul Premier League. Founded in 1946, it is the oldest football league in Afghanistan.

== History ==
The first domestic football league was created in 1946 with the establishment of the Kabul City League, which included 12 clubs. During the 1970s, additional regional and city leagues existed in Herat, Kandahar and Mazar-i-Sharif.

Contemporary reports of the 1970s referred to Kabul's top competition as A Division Football League, comprising the capital's first-grade clubs. It operated on a system of promotion and relegation with the second-tier B Division Football League and the third-tier C Division Football League. The competitions were organised by the Afghan Olympics Committee.

In 2007, the Afghanistan Football Federation established the Kabul Premier League, consisting of the 12 top teams from the A Division Football League. Later reports indicate that the A Division Football League operated as the second tier beneath the Kabul Premier League.

The main venue was the Ghazi Stadium in Kabul, and games were held on different days due to lack of stadiums.

Recent reports in 2020s indicate that the Kabul Premier League continues to operate as the highest division of the Kabul Football Federation, with the First Division serving as the tier below it.

== League champions ==
Champions were:

- 1946: Ariana Kabul F.C.
- 1947: Ariana Kabul F.C.
- 1948: Ariana Kabul F.C.
- 1949: Ariana Kabul F.C.
- 1950: Ariana Kabul F.C.
- 1951: Ariana Kabul F.C.
- 1952: Ariana Kabul F.C.
- 1953: Ariana Kabul F.C.
- 1954: Ariana Kabul F.C.
- 1955: Ariana Kabul F.C.
- 1956-75: Unknown
- 1976: Pamir Kabul F.C.
- 1977-82: Unknown
- 1983: National Guard
- 1984: National Guard
- 1985-94: Unknown
- 1995: Karlappan
- 1996: Unknown
- 1997-98: Maiwand Kabul FC
- 1999-02: Unknown
- 2003: Seramiasht FC
- 2004: Ordu FC
- 2005: Ordu FC
- 2006: Ordu FC
- 2007-16: Unknown
- 2017: Muttahid Afghan FC
- 2018-24: Unknown
- 2025: Daudzai FC
- 2026: Javanan Mihan Kabul FC
