= Pamir Kabul F.C. =

Association football club in Afghanistan

Pamir F.C.
- Full name: Pamir Kabul Football Club
- Ground: Central Stadium; Kabul, Afghanistan
- Capacity: 7,000
- League: Kabul A Division Football League

Pamir Kabul Football Club is a football team based in Kabul, Afghanistan.

== History ==
The team was founded in 1968–1969.

Pamir Club was one of the dominant clubs in Afghan domestic football in the 1970s. In 1976, the team won the Kabul A Division Football League defeating Kabura Club in the final. In June 1977, the team played against the visiting Sattar Club of Pakistan in one of the four matches of the visitors in Kabul, defeating them by 2–1.

Following the fall of the Taliban, Pamir resumed competitive football in Kabul. In January 2002, the club competed in the Hindu Kush League and received footballs and a full set of kits donated by BBC Radio 5 Live. The BBC reported that the team faced severe shortages of sporting equipment after decades of conflict.

In 2007, the team entered the inaugural Kabul Premier League as one of the 12 top teams from the Kabul A Division Football League. After relegation, the team reached the final of the Kabul A Division Football League in 2013, and earned promotion to the 2014 Kabul Premier League.
