= Mansur Faqiryar =

Afghan footballer

Personal information
- Date of birth: 3 January 1986 (age 40)
- Place of birth: Kabul, Democratic Republic of Afghanistan
- Height: 1.75 m (5 ft 9 in)
- Position: Goalkeeper

Senior career*
Years	Team	Apps	(Gls)
2005–2006	FC Union 60 Bremen		
2006–2009	FC Oberneuland	44	(0)
2007–2008	→ Goslarer SC (loan)		
2009–2015	VfB Oldenburg	122	(0)

International career
2011–2016	Afghanistan	23	(0)
Medal record
Men's football
Representing Afghanistan
SAFF Championship
Winner	2013 Nepal
- * Club domestic league appearances and goals

Mansur Faqiryar (born 3 January 1986) is an Afghan former footballer who played as a goalkeeper. He played for clubs in Germany and represented the Afghanistan national team at international level.

== Club career ==
In 2005, Faqiryar signed for amateur club FC Union 60 Bremen. He played there for one season before moving to FC Oberneuland in 2006. Whilst at the club he managed 44 appearances in the league as well as two appearances in the DFB-Pokal.

In 2009, he signed with Niedersachsenliga club VfB Oldenburg.

== International career ==
In 2011, Faqiryar made his debut for the Afghanistan national team, in a 3–0 win over Bhutan. In 2011, he collected five caps overall. He was voted Best Player of the Tournament in the SAFF 2013 for his great goalkeeping efforts.

== Career statistics ==
Appearances and goals by club, season and competition
Club	Season	League			DFB-Pokal		Other		Total	
Club	Season	Division	Apps	Goals	Apps	Goals	Apps	Goals	Apps	Goals
FC Union 60 Bremen	2005–06	Bezirksliga Bremen			–		–			
FC Oberneuland	2006–07	Bremen-Liga	6	0	–		–		6	0
FC Oberneuland	2007–08	Bremen-Liga	14	0	–		2	0	16	0
FC Oberneuland	2008–09	Regionalliga Nord	24	0	2	0	–		26	0
FC Oberneuland	Total		44	0	2	0	2	0	48	0
Goslarer SC (loan)	2007–08	Landesliga Braunschweig			–		–			
VfB Oldenburg	2009–10	Niedersachsenliga	31	0	–		–		31	0
VfB Oldenburg	2010–11	Niedersachsenliga	17	0	–		–		17	0
VfB Oldenburg	2011–12	Niedersachsenliga	14	0	0	0	–		14	0
VfB Oldenburg	2012–13	Regionalliga Nord	30	0	–		–		30	0
VfB Oldenburg	2013–14	Regionalliga Nord	28	0	–		–		28	0
VfB Oldenburg	2014–15	Regionalliga Nord	2	0	–		–		2	0
VfB Oldenburg	Total		122	0	0	0	0	0	122	0
Career total			166	0	2	0	2	0	170	0

== Honours ==
Afghanistan

- SAFF Championship: 2013

Individual

- SAFF Championship Best Goalkeeper Award: 2013
- SAFF Championship Best Player Award: 2013
