= Faisal Sakhizada =

Afghan footballer (born 1990)

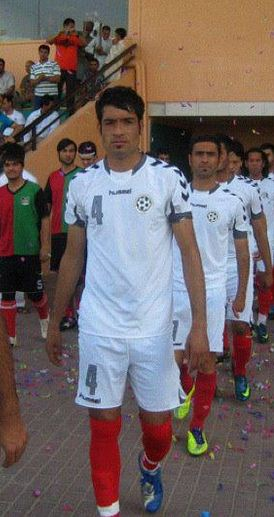
- Sakhizada with Afghanistan at the 2011 SAFF Championship

Personal information
- Full name: Faisal Safa Sakhizada
- Date of birth: 15 June 1990 (age 36)
- Place of birth: Kabul, Afghanistan
- Height: 1.90 m (6 ft 3 in)
- Position: Defender

Team information
- Current team: Kingston City FC
- Number: 5

Senior career*
Years	Team	Apps	(Gls)
2006	Pamir Kabul		
2007–2008	Kam Air		
2009–2012	Ordu Kabul		
2012	Toofaan Harirod	17	(1)
2012–2016	Dandenong Thunder	92	(8)
2016–	Kingston City	103	(7)

International career^{‡}
2006–2008	Afghanistan U20		
2008–2010	Afghanistan U23		
2008–2015	Afghanistan	24	(0)
- * Club domestic league appearances and goals as of 25 November 2022 ‡ National team caps and goals as of 3 September 2015

Faisal Safa Sakhizada (Persian: فیصل سخی‌زاده; born 15 June 1990) is an Afghan professional footballer who plays as a defender for Australian side Kingston City. He has played for the Afghanistan national team.

== International career ==
Safa has represented Afghanistan at the under-20 and under-23 levels. He made his debut for the senior team in 2010, making a total of 24 appearances over the next five years.
