= 2013 SAFF Championship =

- 2013 SAFF Championship official logo

Tournament details
- Host country: Nepal
- Dates: 31 August – 11 September
- Teams: 8
- Venues: 2 (in 1 host city)

Final positions
- Champions: Afghanistan (1st title)
- Runners-up: India

Tournament statistics
- Matches played: 15
- Goals scored: 51 (3.4 per match)
- Top scorer: (Maldives) Ali Ashfaq (10 goals)
- Best player(s): (Afghanistan) Mansur Faqiryar (MVP) (Nepal) Rabin Shrestha (Best Player from host country)
- Best goalkeeper: (Afghanistan) Mansur Faqiryar

The 2013 South Asian Football Federation Championship, commonly referred to as 2013 SAFF Championship, was the 10th SAFF Championship for men's national football teams organized by the South Asian Football Federation (SAFF). The tournament took place from 31 August to 11 September 2013, and was hosted by Nepal for the second time, with the previous being in 1997.

== Host selection ==
Nepal were selected as hosts in September 2012 during the 2012 SAFF Women's Championship in Sri Lanka.

== Broadcasting ==
The tournament was broadcast live in Nepal on Kantipur Television Network, Tolo TV in Afghanistan and Television Maldives in Maldives. Every match was broadcast live on YouTube.

== Participating nations ==
Along with the hosts, the other seven nations from the South Asian region participated in the tournament. India came into the tournament as the reigning champions from the 2011 edition.

Team	Appearances in the SAFF Championship	Previous best performance	FIFA Ranking at start of event
Nepal	10th	Third-Place (1993)	170
Afghanistan	6th	Runners-up (2011)	139
Bangladesh	9th	Champions (2003)	158
Bhutan	6th	Semi-finals (2008)	207
India	10th	Champions (1993, 1997, 1999, 2005, 2009, 2011)	145
Maldives	8th	Champions (2008, 2018)	153
Pakistan	10th	Third-Place (1997)	167
Sri Lanka	10th	Champions (1995)	170

=== Group draw ===
The draw ceremony took place on 30 July 2013 at Kathmandu's Soaltee Crowne Plaza was attended by a host of dignitaries including All Nepal Football Association (ANFA) Chairman Ganesh Thapa, SAFF President Kazi Salahuddin, Secretary Alberto Colaco and National Sports Council Member-Secretary Yubaraj Lama.

Group A	Group B
Bangladesh; India; Nepal; Pakistan	Afghanistan; Bhutan; Maldives; Sri Lanka

== Venues ==
Kathmandu
Dasarath Rangasala Stadium	Halchowk Stadium
Capacity: 25,000	Capacity: 3,500
2013 SAFF Championship is located in Nepal

== Match officials ==
On 22 August 2013, SAFF announced the 15 referees for the tournament.

Referees

- (Bangladesh) Tayeb Shamsuzzaman
- (India) Pratap Singh
- (Jordan) Adham Makhadmeh
- (Nepal) Sudish Pandey
- (Saudi Arabia) Saleh Al Hethlol
- (Sri Lanka) Hettikamkanamge Perera

Assistant referees

- (Afghanistan) Shirzad Alimaqa
- (Bhutan) Ugyen Dorji
- (Jordan) Ahmad Al Roalle
- (Jordan) Issa Al Amawe
- (Maldives) Ahmed Ameez
- (Nepal) Naniram Thapa Magar
- (Pakistan) Murad Waheed
- (Saudi Arabia) Abdulaziz Al Asmari
- (Saudi Arabia) Khalid Al Doghairi

== Group stage ==
SAFF confirmed the groups and schedule on 30 July 2013.

All times listed are Nepali Standard Time.

Key to colors in group tables
Teams that advance to the semi-finals: Group winners; Group runners-up

=== Group A ===
Team	Pld	W	D	L	GF	GA	GD	Pts
Nepal	3	2	1	0	5	2	+3	7
India	3	1	1	1	3	3	0	4
Pakistan	3	1	1	1	3	3	0	4
Bangladesh	3	0	1	2	2	5	−3	1

Source: RSSSF
31 August 2013
18:30

Nepal	2–0	Bangladesh
Gurung 18'; Khawas 31'	Report

Dasarath Rangasala Stadium, Kathmandu
Referee: Adham Makhadmeh (Jordan)
1 September 2013
18:30

India	1–0	Pakistan
Ishaq 14' (o.g.)	Report

Halchowk Stadium, Kathmandu
Referee: Hettikamkanamge Perera (Sri Lanka)

3 September 2013
15:30

Bangladesh	1–1	India
Meshu 82'	Report	Chhetri 90+5'

Halchowk Stadium, Kathmandu
Referee: Hettikamkanamge Perera (Sri Lanka)
3 September 2013
18:30

Pakistan	1–1	Nepal
Bashir 14'	Report	Magar 90+2'

Dasarath Rangasala Stadium, Kathmandu
Referee: Saleh Al Hethlol (Saudi Arabia)

5 September 2013
15:30

India	1–2	Nepal
Nabi 90+2'	Report	Gurung 70'; Rai 81'

Dasarath Rangasala Stadium, Kathmandu
Referee: Adham Makhadmeh (Jordan)
5 September 2013
15:30

Bangladesh	1–2	Pakistan
Ameli 30'	Report	Ishaq 36'; Kaleemullah 90+2'

Halchowk Stadium, Kathmandu
Referee: Saleh Al Hethlol (Saudi Arabia)

=== Group B ===
Team	Pld	W	D	L	GF	GA	GD	Pts
Maldives	3	2	1	0	18	2	+16	7
Afghanistan	3	2	1	0	6	1	+5	7
Sri Lanka	3	1	0	2	6	15	−9	3
Bhutan	3	0	0	3	4	16	−12	0

Source: RSSSF
2 September 2013
15:30

Afghanistan	3–0	Bhutan
Amiri 37'; Azadzoy 76'; Barakzai 88'	Report

Halchowk Stadium, Kathmandu
Referee: Sudish Pandey (Nepal)
2 September 2013
18:30

Maldives	10–0	Sri Lanka
Abdulla 5'; Ashfaq 21' (pen.), 45+1' (pen.), 51', 53', 58', 87'; Adhuham 76'; Fasir 83'; Umar 86'	Report

Dasarath Rangasala Stadium, Kathmandu
Referee: Pratap Singh (India)

4 September 2013
15:30

Sri Lanka	1–3	Afghanistan
Fazaluzzaman 36'	Report	Rafi 62'; Amiri 76'; Barakzai 87'

Halchowk Stadium, Kathmandu
Referee: Sudish Pandey (Nepal)
4 September 2013
18:30

Bhutan	2–8	Maldives
P. Tshering 25'; C. Gyeltshen 35'	Report	Fasir 16', 69'; Umair 45+3'; Ashfaq 48', 51', 76', 79'; Umar 82'

Dasarath Rangasala Stadium, Kathmandu
Referee: Tayeb Shamsuzzaman (Bangladesh)

6 September 2013
15:30

Afghanistan	0–0	Maldives
	Report

Dasarath Rangasala Stadium, Kathmandu
Referee: Tayeb Shamsuzzaman (Bangladesh)
6 September 2013
15:30

Sri Lanka	5–2	Bhutan
Izzadeen 19', 26', 50', 90+3'; P. Dorji 32' (o.g.)	Report	P. Tshering 45'; Tenzin 58'

Halchowk Stadium, Kathmandu
Referee: Pratap Singh (India)

== Knockout stage ==
=== Bracket ===
Semi-finals
8 September – Dasarath Rangasala
Nepal	0
Afghanistan	1
9 September – Dasarath Rangasala
Maldives	0
India	1

Final
11 September – Dasarath Rangasala
Afghanistan	2
India	0

=== Semi-finals ===
8 September 2013
18:30

Nepal	0−1	Afghanistan
	Report	Ahmadi 11'

Dasarath Rangasala Stadium, Kathmandu
Referee: Saleh Al Hethlol (Saudi Arabia)

9 September 2013
18:30

Maldives	0−1	India
	Report	Mondal 86'

Dasarath Rangasala Stadium, Kathmandu
Referee: Adham Makhadmeh (Jordan)

=== Final ===
11 September 2013
18:30

Afghanistan	2–0	India
Azadzoy 9'; Ahmadi 62'	Report

Dasarath Rangasala Stadium, Kathmandu
Referee: Tayeb Shamsuzzaman (Bangladesh)

== Champion ==
SAFF Championship 2013

Afghanistan
First title

== Awards ==
The following awards were given for the 2013 SAFF Championship.

FIFA Fair Play Award	Hero MotoCorp MVP of host nation Award	MVP of the Tournament	Golden Boot Award	Golden Glove Award	NIVIA Best goal of the tournament
Nepal	(Nepal) Rabin Shrestha	(Afghanistan) Mansur Faqiryar	(Maldives) Ali Ashfaq	(Afghanistan) Mansur Faqiryar	(Afghanistan) Zohib Islam Amiri

== Prize money ==
The prize money given to the top four teams:

Final placing	Prize money (US Dollars)
Champions	50,000
Runner-up	25,000
Semi-Finalists	10,000

== Goalscorers ==
10 goals

- (Maldives) Ali Ashfaq

4 goals

- (Sri Lanka) Mohamed Izzadeen

3 goals

- (Maldives) Ali Fasir

2 goals

- (Afghanistan) Sandjar Ahmadi
- (Afghanistan) Zohib Islam Amiri
- (Afghanistan) Mustafa Azadzoy
- (Afghanistan) Hashmatullah Barakzai
- (Bhutan) Passang Tshering
- (Maldives) Ali Umar
- (Nepal) Anil Gurung

1 goal

- (Afghanistan) Mohammad Rafi Barakzai
- (Bangladesh) Jahid Hasan Ameli
- (Bangladesh) Atiqur Rahman Meshu
- (Bhutan) Chencho Gyeltshen
- (Bhutan) Sonam Tenzin
- (India) Sunil Chhetri
- (India) Arnab Mondal
- (India) Syed Nabi
- (Maldives) Assadhulla Abdulla
- (Maldives) Hassan Adhuham
- (Maldives) Mohammad Umair
- (Nepal) Bharat Khawas
- (Nepal) Bimal Magar
- (Nepal) Ju Manu Rai
- (Pakistan) Hassan Bashir
- (Pakistan) Samar Ishaq
- (Pakistan) Kalim Ullah
- (Sri Lanka) Mohamed Fazaluzzaman

1 own goal

- (Bhutan) Pema Dorji (playing against Sri Lanka)
- (Pakistan) Samar Ishaq (playing against India)
