= Mohammad Yousef Kargar =

Afghan footballer and manager

Mohammad Yosuf Kargar
Personal information
- Full name: Mohammad Yosuf Kargar
- Date of birth: 11 May 1963 (age 63)
- Place of birth: Afghanistan

International career
| Years | Team | Apps | (Gls) |
| 1976–1984 | Afghanistan | | |

Managerial career
- 2002–2008: Afghanistan (assistant)
- 2008–2014: Afghanistan

Mohammad Yosuf Kargar (Dari: محمد یوسف کارگر) is an Afghan former football player and manager who is president of the Afghanistan Football Federation. He formerly coached the Afghanistan national team.

== Career ==
Kargar's family set up Afghanistan's first ski resort, and he became the national champion in 1978 at the age of 16. He stopped skiing due to the 1979 Soviet invasion of Afghanistan. During the 1970s and 1980s, he was a member of the Afghanistan national team. He coached Afghan youth teams after becoming the senior manager of the Afghanistan national team in 2001. His biggest achievement is leading the national football team to the SAFF Cup trophy in 2013.

== Attack in January 2015 ==
Kargar was stabbed near his residence in Kabul on 10 January 2015. He sustained a head injury and a knife wound in his back.

== Allegations of corruption ==
Some Afghan national players claimed that Yousef Kargar fixed two matches during an international tournament in Malaysia in 2008. After becoming the President of the Afghanistan Football Federation (AFF) in 2019, he was accused of corruption, match fixing, embezzling and misappropriating the AFF fund. 21 players refused to play for the national team during 2026 World Cup Qualifiers in early 2024 over criticisms against Kargar's administration and corruption in the AFF. Attack Energy SC was dissolved in protest over perceived match fixing in the 2024–25 Afghanistan Champions League and failure of the AFF to investigate that issue properly. There is growing concern that the AFF under Kargar was controlled by the de facto Taliban government and Kargar himself was cooperated and pledged allegiance to the Taliban government.
