= Ordu FC =

Afghan football club

Ordu
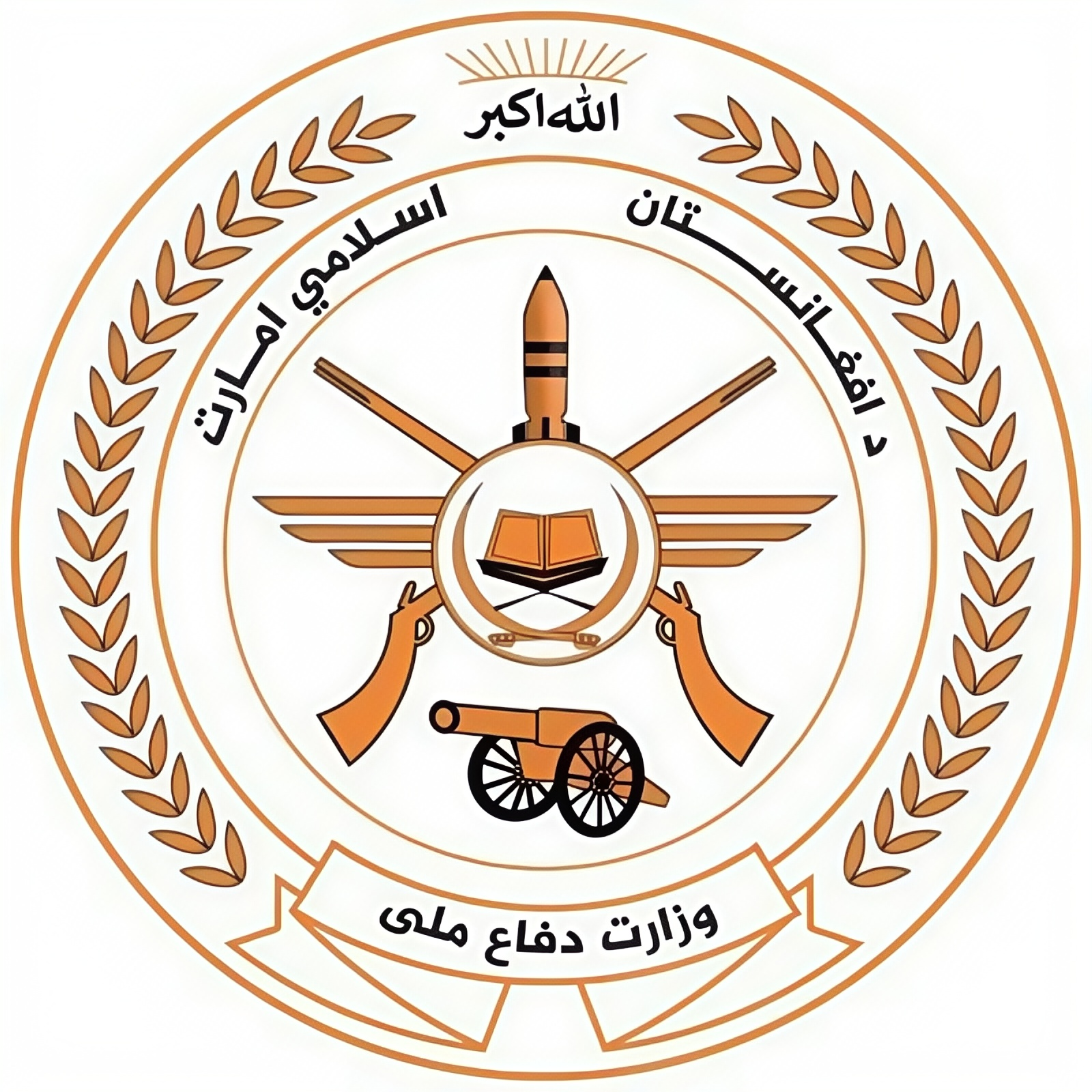
- Full name: Ordu Football Club
- League: Kabul Premier League

Ordu Football Club is a professional football team based in Kabul, Afghanistan. It is associated with the Afghan Army. The club's name derives from the Dari word "ordu" (اردو), meaning "army".

The club also has youth teams. They last competed in the Kabul Premier League.

== History ==
Ordu won three consecutive Kabul A Division Football League titles in 2004, 2005 and 2006. The team won the inaugural 2007 Kabul Premier, finishing unbeaten with ten victories and one draw from eleven matches. It scored 26 goals, conceded two and finished with 31 points. In January 2025, it won the division and earned promotion to the Kabul Premier League.

In January 2026, Ordu won the nine-team Kabul Premier League with 24 points. It defeated Sabawoon 2–0 in its final match. The championship qualified Ordu for the next zonal stage of Afghanistan’s national club competition.

In June 2026, Ordu won the Central Zone's first-stage qualifying competition and advanced to the final national qualification tournament for the sixth season of the Afghanistan Champions League. The club did not secure two qualification places.

== Achievements ==
=== Domestic ===
- Kabul A Division Football League
  - Winners (4): 2004, 2005, 2006, 2025
- Kabul Premier League
  - Winners (2): 2007, 2026
  - Runners-up (1): 2008
