= 2011 SAFF Championship =

- Logo 2011 SAFF Championship

Tournament details
- Host country: India
- Dates: 2–11 December
- Teams: 8
- Venue: 1 (in 1 host city)

Final positions
- Champions: India (6th title)
- Runners-up: Afghanistan

Tournament statistics
- Matches played: 15
- Goals scored: 44 (2.93 per match)
- Top scorer: (India) Sunil Chhetri (7 goals)
- Best player: (India) Sunil Chhetri

The 2011 South Asian Football Federation Championship, sponsored by Karbonn Mobiles and officially named Karbonn SAFF Championship 2011, was the 9th tournament of the SAFF Championship, which held in New Delhi, India.

== Venue ==
It was originally scheduled to take place in Orissa, India, but was switched to New Delhi by the executive committee of the All India Football Federation on 22 September.

The Jawaharlal Nehru Stadium in New Delhi was the main venue for the tournament. It is also the home stadium for India national football team and hosted the 2010 Commonwealth Games.

New Delhi	2011 SAFF Championship is located in India
Jawaharlal Nehru Stadium	2011 SAFF Championship is located in India
Capacity: 60,000	2011 SAFF Championship is located in India

== Draw ==
The draw ceremony took place on 2 November 2011 at New Delhi's Le Meridien Hotel was attended by a host of dignitaries including AIFF General Secretary Kushal Das, SAFF General Secretary Alberto Colaco and Maldives Football Association General Secretary Shah Ismail.

Group A	Group B
India (162) (1st seed); Sri Lanka (176); Afghanistan (178); Bhutan (198)	Maldives (166) (2nd seed); Bangladesh (142); Nepal (143); Pakistan (174)

(The FIFA rankings of the teams at the start of the tournament are given in brackets in the table)

== Group stage ==
All times are Indian Standard Time (IST) – UTC+5:30

Key to colours in group tables
Group winners and runners-up advance to the semi-finals

=== Group A ===
Team	Pld	W	D	L	GF	GA	GD	Pts
Afghanistan	3	2	1	0	12	3	+9	7
India	3	2	1	0	9	1	+8	7
Sri Lanka	3	1	0	2	4	6	−2	3
Bhutan	3	0	0	3	1	16	−15	0

Source: RSSSF
3 December 2011
15:00

India	1–1	Afghanistan
Chhetri 10'	Report	Arezou 5'

Jawaharlal Nehru Stadium, New Delhi
Referee: Nagor Amir Noor Mohamed (Malaysia)
3 December 2011
18:00

Sri Lanka	3–0	Bhutan
Zain 29'; Nipuna 35', 65'	Report

Jawaharlal Nehru Stadium, New Delhi
Referee: Masoud Tufayelieh (Syria)

5 December 2011
15:00

Afghanistan	3–1	Sri Lanka
Ahmadi 22', 36'; Yamrali 79'	Report	Zain 17'

Jawaharlal Nehru Stadium, New Delhi
Referee: Timur Faizullin (Kyrgyzstan)
5 December 2011
18:00

Bhutan	0–5	India
	Report	Nabi 29'; Miranda 44', 58'; Chhetri 69', 84'

Jawaharlal Nehru Stadium, New Delhi
Referee: Sukhbir Singh (Singapore)

7 December 2011
15:00

Bhutan	1–8	Afghanistan
Gyeltshen 22'	Report	Yamrali 4'; Amiri 10'; Arezou 15', 18', 45+2', 83'; Sharityar 48' (pen.); Mashriqi 60'

Jawaharlal Nehru Stadium, New Delhi
Referee: Nivon Robesh Gamini (Sri Lanka)
7 December 2011
18:00

India	3–0	Sri Lanka
Lalpekhlua 50'; Chhetri 70'; Warakagoda 90+3' (o.g.)	Report

Jawaharlal Nehru Stadium, New Delhi
Referee: Timur Faizullin (Kyrgyzstan)

=== Group B ===
Team	Pld	W	D	L	GF	GA	GD	Pts
Maldives	3	1	2	0	4	2	+2	5
Nepal	3	1	2	0	3	2	+1	5
Pakistan	3	0	3	0	1	1	0	3
Bangladesh	3	0	1	2	1	4	−3	1

Source: RSSSF
2 December 2011
15:00

Bangladesh	0–0	Pakistan

Jawaharlal Nehru Stadium, New Delhi
Referee: Timur Faizullin (Kyrgyzstan)
2 December 2011
18:00

Maldives	1–1	Nepal
Ashfaq 45+2'	Report	Sandip 51'

Jawaharlal Nehru Stadium, New Delhi
Referee: Sukhbir Singh (Singapore)

4 December 2011
15:00

Nepal	1–0	Bangladesh
S. Thapa 90+5'	Report

Jawaharlal Nehru Stadium, New Delhi
Referee: Santosh Kumar (India)
4 December 2011
18:00

Pakistan	0–0	Maldives
	Report

Jawaharlal Nehru Stadium, New Delhi
Referee: Nivon Robesh Gamini (Sri Lanka)

6 December 2011
15:00

Pakistan	1–1	Nepal
Ishaq 49' (pen.)	Report	Khawas 37'

Jawaharlal Nehru Stadium, New Delhi
Referee: Nagor Amir Noor Mohamed (Malaysia)
6 December 2011
18:00

Maldives	3–1	Bangladesh
Thariq 6', 17'; Ashfaq 70'	Report	Shahed 29'

Jawaharlal Nehru Stadium, New Delhi
Referee: Masoud Tufayelieh (Syria)

== Knockout stage ==
=== Bracket ===
Semi-finals
9 December — New Delhi
Maldives	1
India	3
9 December — New Delhi
Afghanistan (a.e.t.)	1
Nepal	0

Final
11 December — New Delhi
India	4
Afghanistan	0

=== Semi-finals ===
9 December 2011
15:00

Maldives	1–3	India
Shamweel 60'	Report	Nabi 24'; Chhetri 70' (pen.), 90+1'

Jawaharlal Nehru Stadium, New Delhi
Referee: Timur Faizullin (Kyrgyzstan)
9 December 2011
18:00

Afghanistan	1–0 (a.e.t.)	Nepal
Arezou 101'	Report

Jawaharlal Nehru Stadium, New Delhi
Referee: Masoud Tufayelieh (Syria)

=== Final ===
11 December 2011
18:00

India	4–0	Afghanistan
Chhetri 71' (pen.); Miranda 79'; Lalpekhlua 80'; Sushil 90+5'	Report

Jawaharlal Nehru Stadium, New Delhi
Attendance: 30,000
Referee: Sukhbir Singh (Singapore)

== Champion ==
SAFF Championship 2011

India
Sixth title

== Awards ==
Fair Play Award	Top Scorer	Player of the Tournament
India	(India) Sunil Chhetri	(India) Sunil Chhetri

== Statistics ==
=== Goalscorers ===
7 goals

- (India) Sunil Chhetri

6 goals

- (Afghanistan) Balal Arezou

3 goals

- (India) Clifford Miranda

2 goals

- (Afghanistan) Sandjar Ahmadi
- (Afghanistan) Ata Yamrali
- (India) Syed Rahim Nabi
- (India) Jeje Lalpekhlua
- (Maldives) Ali Ashfaq
- (Maldives) Ahmed Thariq
- (Sri Lanka) Nipuna Bandara
- (Sri Lanka) Mohamed Zain

1 goal

- (Afghanistan) Zohib Islam Amiri
- (Afghanistan) Mohammad Mashriqi
- (Afghanistan) Djelaludin Sharityar
- (Bangladesh) Shahedul Alam Shahed
- (Bhutan) Chencho Gyeltshen
- (India) Sushil Kumar Singh
- (Maldives) Shamweel Qasim
- (Nepal) Bharat Khawas
- (Nepal) Sandip Rai
- (Nepal) Sagar Thapa
- (Pakistan) Samar Ishaq

Own goal

- (Sri Lanka) Bandara Warakagoda (against India)

=== Other statistics ===
- Most wins India 4 wins
- Most Losses Bhutan 3 loss
- Most Draws Pakistan 3 draws
- First goal of the tournament Ali Ashfaq for Maldives vs Nepal
- Most goals scored in a match Afghanistan 8 Goals vs Bhutan
- Lowest scores in a match 1. Bangladesh vs Pakistan 0-0

2. Pakistan vs Maldives 0-0

- Most Goals in a match by one player Balal Arezou for Afghanistan vs Bhutan 4 Goals
- Fastest Goal of the tournament Ata Yamrali for Afghanistan vs Bhutan in 4 Minutes
- Best Defender Djelaludin Sharityar of Afghanistan
- Best match of the tournament Afghanistan vs Nepal 1-0

== Broadcasting ==
=== YouTube Live ===
In a deal with World Sport Group and SAFF's exclusive marketing and media partner, all matches were shown live on YouTube. The live matches are accessible globally through SAFF Youtube Channel except in India, where they were available on a delayed basis the following day.

=== Television ===
Countries	Broadcaster
Afghanistan; Bangladesh; Bhutan; India; Maldives; Nepal; Pakistan	TEN Action+ NEO Sports; Ariana TV1; Doordarshan2; MNBC One

^{1} Only Afghan matches ^{2} Only Indian matches
