= Ghazi Stadium =

Stadium in Kabul, Afghanistan

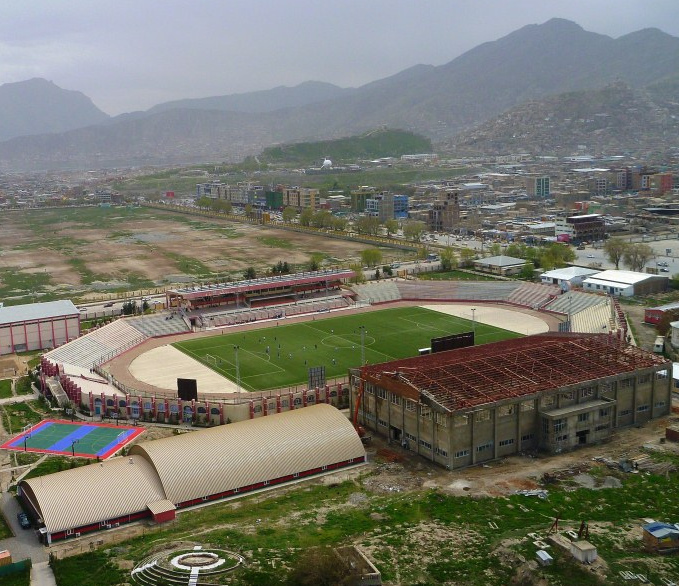
- Aerial view of the stadium in 2013
- Interactive map of Ghazi Stadium
- Full name: Ghazi Stadium
- Location: District 16, Kabul, Afghanistan
- Coordinates: 34°31′07″N 69°11′38″E
- Owner: Afghanistan National Olympic Committee
- Capacity: 25,000
- Surface: Artificial turf

Construction
- Built: 1923; 103 years ago
- Opened: 1923
- Renovated: 2011

Tenants
- Afghanistan national football team Afghanistan women's national football team Afghan Premier League (selected clubs); Afghanistan Champions League (selected clubs); Kabul Premier League; Kabul Cup; Women Kabul League

Ghazi Stadium (Dari: ورزشگاه غازى; Pashto: غازي لوبغالی), also known as Kabul Stadium, is a multi-purpose stadium located southeast of the Shahr-e Naw neighborhood in Kabul, Afghanistan, across from Chaman-e-Hozori and Eidgah Mosque. The stadium is mainly used for local football training and matches. Nearby are the Afghanistan National Olympic Committee, the Afghanistan Football Federation Stadium, the Kabul International Cricket Stadium, and other grounds and facilities for sports.

Ghazi Stadium was built during the reign of King Amanullah Khan in 1923, who is regarded as Ghazi (Hero) for the Afghan victory in the Third Anglo-Afghan War and gaining independence for his nation after the Anglo-Afghan Treaty of 1919. It was last renovated in 2011. The stadium has the capacity to accommodate 25,000 spectators.

== Events ==
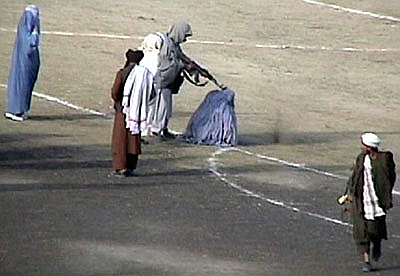
Public execution of a woman, known as Zarmina, by the Taliban at the Ghazi Sports Stadium on 16 November 1999. The mother of five children had been found guilty of killing her husband while he slept.

The first international football event held in Ghazi Stadium was between Afghanistan and Iran on January 1, 1941. The game was a draw with neither team scoring. In 1963, American musician Duke Ellington held a concert here as part of his tour sponsored by the US State Department.

During the First Islamic Emirate of Afghanistan the stadium was used by the Taliban government as a venue for public executions.

The stadium has also housed training facilities for the country's national women's boxing team, as documented in the film The Boxing Girls of Kabul. The stadium was featured in the 2013 documentary, "Heart: The Common Humanity" which detailed the unique group training in Athletics ranging from small boys to Olympic athletes as well as Special Olympians.

== See also ==
- Football in Afghanistan
- Sport in Afghanistan
