= Kabul Premier League =

- Founded: 2007; 19 years ago
- Country: Afghanistan
- Level on pyramid: 2 (overall)
- Promotion to: Afghanistan Champions League
- Relegation to: Kabul A Division Football League

The Kabul Premier League is the first tier provincial football league of Kabul, Afghanistan. It was established by the Afghanistan Football Federation in 2007.

== History ==
In 2007, the Afghanistan Football Federation established the Kabul Premier League as a top tier national league, consisting of the 12 top teams from the Kabul A Division Football League. Later reports indicate that the A Division Football League operated as the second tier beneath the Kabul Premier League.

The main venue was the Ghazi Stadium in Kabul, and games were held on different days due to lack of stadiums. A franchise based Afghan Premier League was formed in 2012, although the Kabul Premier League continued as a regional competition.

Recent reports in 2020s indicate that the Kabul Premier League continues to operate as the highest division of the Kabul Football Federation, with the First Division serving as the tier below it.

== League champions ==
Champions were:

- 2007: Ordu FC
- 2008: League not played
- 2009: Kabul Bank F.C.
- 2010: Feruzi F.C.
- 2011: Big Bear F.C.
- 2012: Feruzi F.C.
- 2013: Big Bear F.C.
- 2014: Feruzi F.C.
- 2015: Unknown
- 2016: Seramiasht FC
- 2017-18: Unknown
- 2019: Mashal FC
- 2021: Jawanan Kabul FC
- 2022-24: Unknown
- 2025-26: Ordu FC
