= List of Afghan football champions =

Afghan League (1st tier)

Kabul A Division Football League (1946–2006) Kabul Premier League (2007–2012) Afghan Premier League (2012–2020) Afghanistan Champions League (2021–present)
- Country
- Afghanistan

The Afghan men's football champions are the winners of the highest league in Afghan football, which since 2021 is the Afghanistan Champions League.

== List ==
=== Kabul A Division Football League (1946–2006) ===
| Year | Champions (number of titles) |
|---|---|
| 1946 | Ariana Kabul |
| 1947 | Ariana Kabul (2) |
| 1948 | Ariana Kabul (3) |
| 1949 | Ariana Kabul (4) |
| 1950 | Ariana Kabul (5) |
| 1951 | Ariana Kabul (6) |
| 1952 | Ariana Kabul (7) |
| 1953 | Ariana Kabul (8) |
| 1954 | Ariana Kabul (9) |
| 1955 | Ariana Kabul (10) |
Championship not known between 1956 and 1975
| 1976 | Pamir Kabul |
Championship not known between 1977 and 1982
| 1983 | National Guard |
| 1984 | National Guard (2) |
Championship not known between 1985 and 1994
| 1995 | Karlappen |
Championship not known in 1996
| 1997–98 | Maiwand |
Championship not known between 1999 and 2002
| 2003 | Seramiasht |
| 2004 | Ordu |
| 2005 | Ordu (2) |
| 2006 | Ordu (3) |

=== Kabul Premier League (2007–2012) ===
| Year | Champions (number of titles) |
|---|---|
| 2007 | Ordu (4) |
| 2008 | League not played |
| 2009 | Kabul Bank |
| 2010 | Feruzi (2) |
| 2011 | Big Bear |
| 2012 | Feruzi (3) |

=== Afghan Premier League (2012–2020) ===
| Year | Champions (number of titles) | Score | Runners-up |
|---|---|---|---|
| 2012 | Toofan Harirod | 2–1 | Simorgh Alborz |
| 2013 | Shaheen Asmayee | 3–1 | Simorgh Alborz |
| 2014 | Shaheen Asmayee (2) | 3–2 | Oqaban Hindukush |
| 2015 | De Spin Ghar Bazan | 0–0 (4–3) | Shaheen Asmayee |
| 2016 | Shaheen Asmayee (3) | 2–1 | De Maiwand Atalan |
| 2017 | Shaheen Asmayee (4) | 4–3 | De Maiwand Atalan |
| 2018 | Toofan Harirod | 1–0 | Shaheen Asmayee |
| 2019 | Toofan Harirod (2) | 1–0 | Shaheen Asmayee |
| 2020 | Shaheen Asmayee (5) | 1–0 | Simorgh Alborz |

=== Afghanistan Champions League (2021–present) ===
| Year | Winner | Runners-up |
|---|---|---|
| 2021 | Sorkh Poshan | |
| 2022 | Attack Energy | Abu Muslim |
| 2024 | Attack Energy (2) | Sorkh Poshan |
| 2024–25 | Abu Muslim | Attack Energy |
| 2025 | Abu Muslim (2) | Sorkh Poshan |

== Total titles won ==
| Rank | Club | Winners | Winning seasons |
|---|---|---|---|
| 1 | Ariana Kabul | 10 | 1946, 1947, 1948, 1949, 1950, 1951, 1952, 1953, 1954, 1955 |
| 2 | Shaheen Asmayee | 5 | 2013, 2014, 2016, 2017, 2020 |
| 3 | Ordu | 4 | 2004, 2005, 2006, 2007 |
| 4 | Toofan Harirod | 3 | 2012, 2018, 2019 |
| 4 | Feruzi | 3 | 2009, 2010, 2012 |
| 6 | National Guard | 2 | 1983, 1984 |
| 6 | Attack Energy | 2 | 2022 |
| 6 | Abu Muslim | 2 | 2024–25, 2025 |

== See also ==
- List of association football competitions
