= 2015 Afghan Premier League Final =

- Event: 2015 Afghan Premier League
Shaheen Asmayee	De Spin Ghar Bazan
0	0
- De Spin Ghar Bazan won 4–3 on penalties
- Date: 2 October 2015
- Venue: AFF Stadium, Kabul City, Kabul, Afghanistan
- Man of the Match: Ghulam Hazrat Niazi (De Spin Ghar Bazan F.C.)
- Referee: Halim Aqa Sherzad (Afghanistan)
- Attendance: 5,000

The 2015 Afghan Premier League Final was the final match of the 2015 Afghan Premier League, the 4th season of Afghanistan's premier club football tournament organised by Roshan.

The match took place on Friday, 2 October 2015, at the AFF Stadium in Kabul, Afghanistan, between Greater Kabul Region Shaheen Asmayee and Eastern region De Spin Ghar Bazan. It was the fourth tournament final since the establishment of Afghan Premier League. De Spin Ghar Bazan won the match 4–3 at the penalty shootout after extra time.

== Venue ==
The Afghanistan Football Federation Stadium in Kabul, Afghanistan, was the venue of the 2015 Afghan Premier League Final for the fourth time.

The home stadium of all Afghan Premier League teams since its establishment, The stadium has a capacity of 5,000, and the surface is of Artificial turf.

== Background ==
This was the first time in the history of De Spin Ghar Bazan that reached the final. It was also the third time for Shaheen Asmayee that reached the final, although having won two times. Shaheen Asmayee reached a record 3rd final after a 4–3 aggregate win against North Eastern region Mawjhai Amu, making it the first club that reached the final three times in a row. Previously Shaheen Asmayee won finals in 2013 and 2014.

In the other side De Spin Ghar Bazan reached the final after 3 seasons waiting for the first time, after a 4–2 penalty shootout win against South West region De Maiwand Atalan.

== Pre-match ==
=== Ticketing ===
Tickets were available in two price categories: 50 Afs, 100 Afs.

=== Referee ===
Halim Aqa Sherzad was chosen for judgement of the final match.

== Road to the final ==
(Afghanistan) Shaheen Asmayee				Round	(Afghanistan) De Spin Ghar Bazan			
Opponent	Result			Group stage	Opponent	Result		
(Afghanistan) Simorgh Alborz	1–3			Matchday 1	(Afghanistan) Mawjhai Amu	2–2		
(Afghanistan) Toofaan Harirod	3–0			Matchday 2	(Afghanistan) De Abasin Sape	3–1		
(Afghanistan) De Maiwand Atalan	1–0			Matchday 3	(Afghanistan) Oqaban Hindukush	2–0		
Group B winner: Team / Pld / W / D / L / GF / GA / GD / Pts; (Afghanistan) Shaheen Asmayee / 3 / 2 / 0 / 1 / 5 / 3 / +2 / 6; (Afghanistan) De Maiwand Atalan / 3 / 1 / 1 / 1 / 4 / 4 / +0 / 4; (Afghanistan) Toofaan Harirod / 3 / 1 / 1 / 1 / 5 / 7 / -2 / 4; (Afghanistan) Simorgh Alborz / 3 / 1 / 0 / 2 / 6 / 6 / +2 / 3				Final standings	Group A winner: Team / Pld / W / D / L / GF / GA / GD / Pts; (Afghanistan) De Spin Ghar Bazan / 3 / 2 / 1 / 0 / 7 / 3 / +4 / 7; (Afghanistan) Mawjhai Amu / 3 / 2 / 1 / 0 / 3 / 3 / +0 / 7; (Afghanistan) Oqaban Hindukush / 3 / 1 / 1 / 2 / 3 / 2 / −1 / 4; (Afghanistan) De Abasin Sape / 3 / 0 / 1 / 2 / 2 / 5 / -3 / 1			
Opponent	Agg.	1st leg	2nd leg	Knockout phase	Opponent	Agg.	1st leg	2nd leg
(Afghanistan) Mawjhai Amu	4–3	3–2	1–1	Semi-finals	(Afghanistan) De Maiwand Atalan	2–2; 2-4 p.	0–1	2–1

== Match ==
=== Summary ===
The championship match between Shaheen Asmayee and De Spinghar Bazan kicked with a powerful start by Bazan, they blew past Shaheen's midfielders and dueled with their defensive line, threatening an early goal against Shaheen.

A long range strike by Shaheen's Samiullah at the 4th minute missed the goal but helped Shaheen swing by the momentum of the match in their favor. They soon took the fight back to Bazan's goal area and fired on the goal in the 6th minute but thanks to Bazan's goalie Zohaib ‘s agility and talent, he made a perfect save and kept Bazan in the game.

Supported by brilliant work from their midfielders, Shaheen's Hashmatullah spent much of the first half relentlessly assaulting Bazan's goal area but again Zohaib Aseel revealed himself as special talent, stopping multiple shots on goal that would have bypassed a lesser goalie.

The second half ended in a scoreless stalemate between Shaheen and Bazazn but with Shaheen commanding the majority of the play throughout. The second half started with Shaheen's Hashmatullah again on the hunt for his first goal of the game and powerful header at the 54th minute mark almost lands but misses the goal by centimeters.

Bazan's midfield and defensive line seemed to come apart in the second half and Zohaib Aseel found himself hard pressed and again tested multiple times by the strikers in the league. And Zohaib passes each test, diving, deflecting and intercepting many difficult shots on goal by Shaheen's best. Thanks to his work at Bazan's net, the team rallies and by the 75th minute they began to increasingly threaten Shaheen's goal area. Bazan's Faqeer fires at the goal at the 78th minute but the shot goes wide followed by a narrow miss by his fellow forward Manan Farahi at the 79th With each side pointless by the end of the 90th minute the game moved into extra time.

Bazan's youthfulness as a team began to make a difference and Shaheen unexpectedly found themselves battling against a strong offensive led by Bazan's young midfielders and forwards. Still, it was not enough to decide the game and a second extra time period had to be called. Shaheen took advantage of the next extra time period to press Bazan extremely hard, they were able to keep most of the play in Bazan's penalty area and it was only a mixture of fierce determination by Zohaib and the entire rest of the Bazan team that prevented them from scoring. The clock ran out on the second extra period with a score of 0 – 0 moving the game into the decisive penalty shoot out phase.

During the penalty shootout, De Spin Ghar Bazan scored four penalties to Shaheen Asmayee's three, winning the 2015 RAPL championship. The victory gave De Spin Ghar Bazan the 2015 Roshan Afghan Premier League title.

=== Details ===
2015 Afghan Premier League
2 October 2015
14:30 AFT
Final

Shaheen Asmayee	0-0 (a.e.t.)	De Spin Ghar Bazan
Sayed Maqsood (yellow card) 88'; Hashmatullah (yellow card) 92'; Muqadar (yellow card) 106'; Mahmood Azad (yellow card) 108'	Report	Abdullah Abdali (yellow card) 99'; Shir Ali (yellow card) 106'; Ahmad Reshad (yellow card) 117'; Abdul Manan Azimi (yellow card) 122'
Penalties
Samiullah (penalty scored); Fardeen (penalty scored); Hashmatullah (penalty scored)	3-4	(penalty scored) Rohid; (penalty scored) Abdul Manan; (penalty scored) Ghulam; (penalty scored) Ahmad reshad

AFF Stadium, Kabul
Attendance: 5,000
Referee: Halim Aqa Sherzad

Shaheen Asmayee	De Spin Ghar Bazan

GK	1	(Afghanistan) Hamidullah Yousafzai
RB	14	(Afghanistan) Muqadar Qazizadah	(yellow card) 106'
CB	4	(Afghanistan) Mujtaba Faiz (c)
CB	16	(Afghanistan) Sayed Mohammad
LB	3	(Afghanistan) Abdul Wakeel
RM	19	(Afghanistan) Faisal Sultani
CM	7	(Afghanistan) Sayed Maqsood	(yellow card) 88'
LM	8	(Afghanistan) Samiullah
RF	18	(Afghanistan) jamil Naseeri
CF	10	(Afghanistan) Hashmatullah Barakzai	(yellow card) 92'
LF	17	(Afghanistan) Fardeen Hakimi
Substitutes:
GK	20	(Afghanistan) Fardeen Kohistani
DF	5	(Afghanistan) Ashraf Babakarkhel
DF	18	(Afghanistan) Abdul Wakeel Kamalpoori
DF	15	(Afghanistan) Salim Saifi
MF	13	(Afghanistan) Mahmood Azad (yellow card) 108'
FW	9	(Afghanistan) Amredin Sharifi
Manager:
(Tajikistan) Boir Igamberdiev

style="

GK	1	(Afghanistan) Zohaib Aseel
RB	4	(Afghanistan) Abdullah Abdali	(yellow card) 99'
CB	5	(Afghanistan) Manan Farahi
CB	15	(Afghanistan) Zekrya Azizi
LB	20	(Afghanistan) Amanullah
RM	19	(Afghanistan) Hamid Habibi
CM	17	(Afghanistan) Abdul Mobin
CM	8	(Afghanistan) Ghulam hazrat
LM	10	(Afghanistan) Shafaq Ayabi
CF	6	(Afghanistan) Faqeer Hussain
CF	7	(Afghanistan) Fahim Afkar (c)
Substitutes:
Manager:
(Tajikistan) Vali Igamberdiev

Man of the Match: (Afghanistan) Ghulam Hazrat Niazi (De Spin Ghar Bazan)

Match rules

- 90 minutes.
- 30 minutes of extra time if necessary.
- Penalty shoot-out if scores still level.
- Seven named substitutes.
- Maximum of three substitutions.

=== Statistics ===
Overall
	Shaheen Asmayee	De Spinghar Bazan
Goals scored	0	0
Total shots	19	9
Shots on target	14	4
Ball possession	55%	45%
Corner kicks	15	2
Fouls committed	11	17
Offsides	1	3
Yellow cards	4	4
Red cards	0	0

== See also ==
- Afghan Premier League
- 2015 Afghan Premier League
