= 2013 SAFF Championship squads =

Below are the squads for the 2013 South Asian Football Federation Cup, hosted by Nepal, which took place between 31 August and 11 September 2013. The player's total caps, their club teams and age are given below.

== Group A ==
=== Nepal ===
Coach: (United States) Jack Stefanowski

No.	Pos.	Player	Date of birth (age)	Club
1	GK	Ritesh Thapa	2 October 1984 (aged 28)	(All Nepal Football Association) Nepal Police
2	DF	Rabin Shrestha	26 December 1990 (aged 22)	(All Nepal Football Association) Nepal Police
3	DF	Biraj Maharjan	3 October 1987 (aged 25)	(All Nepal Football Association) Three Star
5	DF	Sabindra Shrestha	5 January 1992 (aged 21)	(All Nepal Football Association) Three Star
8	MF	Jagjit Shrestha	10 August 1992 (aged 21)	(All Nepal Football Association) Three Star
9	FW	Santosh Sahukhala	6 June 1988 (aged 25)	(All Nepal Football Association) Three Star
10	FW	Anil Gurung	23 September 1988 (aged 24)	(All Nepal Football Association) Manang Marshyangdi
11	FW	Ju Manu Rai	1 March 1983 (aged 30)	(All Nepal Football Association) Nepal Police
12	MF	Bikram Lama	29 August 1989 (aged 24)	(All Nepal Football Association) Three Star
13	DF	Sandip Rai	25 September 1988 (aged 24)	(All Nepal Football Association) Three Star
14	MF	Prakash Budhathoki	21 May 1993 (aged 20)	(All Nepal Football Association) Friends Club
15	MF	Raju Tamang	27 October 1985 (aged 27)	(All Nepal Football Association) Nepal Army
16	GK	Kiran Chemjong	20 March 1990 (aged 23)	(All Nepal Football Association) Three Star
17	MF	Bhola Silwal	4 January 1987 (aged 26)	(All Nepal Football Association) Nepal Police
19	DF	Sagar Thapa (c)	19 January 1984 (aged 29)	(All Nepal Football Association) Manang Marshyangdi Club
21	FW	Bharat Khawas	16 April 1992 (aged 21)	(All Nepal Football Association) Nepal Army Club
22	GK	Bishal Shrestha	12 September 1992 (aged 20)	(All Nepal Football Association) Manang Marshyangdi Club
25	FW	Bimal Magar	18 September 1997 (aged 15)	(All Nepal Football Association) ANFA Academy
28	MF	Tanka Basnet	12 December 1990 (aged 22)	(All Nepal Football Association) Nepal Army
32	DF	Rohit Chand	1 March 1992 (aged 21)	(Football Association of Indonesia) Persija Jakarta

=== Bangladesh ===
Coach: (Netherlands) Lodewijk de Kruif

No.	Pos.	Player	Date of birth (age)	Club
1	GK	Biplob Bhattacharjee	1 July 1981 (aged 32)	(Bangladesh Football Federation) Sheikh Russel KC
2	DF	Ashraf Mahmud Linkon	6 June 1990 (aged 23)	(Bangladesh Football Federation) Sheikh Russel KC
3	DF	Waly Faisal	1 March 1985 (aged 28)	(Bangladesh Football Federation) Dhaka Abahani
4	DF	Nasiruddin Chowdhury	9 October 1979 (aged 33)	(Bangladesh Football Federation) Sheikh Jamal Dhanmondi Club
5	DF	Mohammed Ariful Islam	20 December 1987 (aged 25)	(Bangladesh Football Federation) Sheikh Jamal Dhanmondi Club
6	DF	Atiqur Rahman Meshu	26 August 1988 (aged 25)	(Bangladesh Football Federation) Dhaka Abahani
7	MF	Mohamed Zahid Hossain	15 June 1988 (aged 25)	(Bangladesh Football Federation) Sheikh Russel KC
8	MF	Mamunul Islam (c)	12 December 1988 (aged 24)	(Bangladesh Football Federation) Sheikh Russel KC
9	FW	Mithun Chowdhury Mithun	10 February 1989 (aged 24)	(Bangladesh Football Federation) Sheikh Russel KC
10	FW	Jahid Hasan Ameli	25 December 1987 (aged 25)	(Bangladesh Football Federation) Sheikh Russel KC
11	FW	Toklis Ahmed	14 September 1990 (aged 22)	(Bangladesh Football Federation) Team BJMC
12	MF	Mobarak Hossain Bhuyan	12 December 1990 (aged 22)	(Bangladesh Football Federation) Mohammedan SC
14	MF	Omar Faruque Babu	4 August 1987 (aged 26)	(Bangladesh Football Federation) Team BJMC
15	MF	Jamal Bhuyan	10 April 1990 (aged 23)	(Danish Football Association) Hellerup IK
16	DF	Raihan Hasan	2 September 1987 (aged 25)	(Bangladesh Football Federation) Sheikh Jamal Dhanmondi Club
17	MF	Sohel Rana	27 March 1995 (aged 18)	(Bangladesh Football Federation) Mohammedan SC
20	FW	Shakhawat Hossain Rony	1 November 1985 (aged 27)	(Bangladesh Football Federation) Dhaka Abahani
21	FW	Wahed Ahmed	24 September 1989 (aged 23)	(Bangladesh Football Federation) Mohammedan SC
22	GK	Mamun Khan	20 December 1985 (aged 27)	(Bangladesh Football Federation) Mohammedan SC
25	GK	Ziaur Rahman Zia	5 April 1985 (aged 28)	

=== India ===
Coach: (Netherlands) Wim Koevermans

No.	Pos.	Player	Date of birth (age)	Club
1	GK	Karanjit Singh	8 January 1986 (aged 27)	(All India Football Federation) Salgaocar
3	DF	Raju Gaikwad	25 September 1990 (aged 22)	(All India Football Federation) East Bengal
4	DF	Nirmal Chettri	21 October 1990 (aged 22)	(All India Football Federation) Mohun Bagan
5	DF	Arnab Mondal	25 September 1989 (aged 23)	(All India Football Federation) East Bengal
6	MF	Lenny Rodrigues	10 May 1987 (aged 26)	(All India Football Federation) Churchill Brothers
7	MF	Mehtab Hossain	5 September 1985 (aged 27)	(All India Football Federation) East Bengal
8	MF	Francis Fernandes	25 November 1985 (aged 27)	(All India Football Federation) Salgaocar
9	MF	Alwyn George	1 March 1992 (aged 21)	(All India Football Federation) Pailan Arrows
10	FW	Jeje Lalpekhlua	7 January 1991 (aged 22)	(All India Football Federation) Dempo
11	FW	Sunil Chhetri (c)	3 August 1984 (aged 29)	(All India Football Federation) Bengaluru FC
12	DF	Nallappan Mohanraj	28 August 1989 (aged 24)	(All India Football Federation) Pune
13	DF	Sandesh Jhingan	21 July 1993 (aged 20)	(All India Football Federation) Pailan Arrows
14	MF	Arata Izumi	31 July 1982 (aged 31)	(All India Football Federation) Pune
16	GK	Subrata Pal	24 November 1986 (aged 26)	(All India Football Federation) Prayag United
17	MF	Jewel Raja Shaikh	19 January 1990 (aged 23)	(All India Football Federation) Dempo
19	DF	Gouramangi Singh	25 January 1986 (aged 27)	(All India Football Federation) Prayag United
22	MF	Syed Rahim Nabi	14 December 1985 (aged 27)	(All India Football Federation) Mohun Bagan
23	FW	Robin Singh	9 May 1990 (aged 23)	(All India Football Federation) Bengaluru FC
28	FW	Dawson Fernandes	27 July 1990 (aged 23)	(All India Football Federation) Sporting Goa
34	GK	Sandip Nandy	15 January 1975 (aged 38)	(All India Football Federation) Mohun Bagan

=== Pakistan ===
Coach: (Pakistan) Shahzad Anwar

No.	Pos.	Player	Date of birth (age)	Club
1	GK	Muzammil Hussain	6 September 1993 (aged 19)	(Pakistan Football Federation) WAPDA
3	DF	Mohammad Ahmed	3 January 1988 (aged 25)	(Pakistan Football Federation) WAPDA
4	DF	Kamran Khan	3 September 1985 (aged 27)	(Pakistan Football Federation) Khan Research Laboratories
5	DF	Samar Ishaq	1 January 1986 (aged 27)	(Pakistan Football Federation) Khan Research Laboratories
6	MF	Zia Us-Salam	2 April 1990 (aged 23)	(Pakistan Football Federation) Khan Research Laboratories
8	MF	Adnan Ahmed	7 June 1984 (aged 29)	(The Football Association) Droylsden
10	MF	Kalim Ullah	9 August 1992 (aged 21)	(Pakistan Football Federation) Khan Research Laboratories
11	FW	Hassan Bashir	7 January 1987 (aged 26)	(Danish Football Association) Fremad Amager
13	DF	Ahsan Ullah	13 December 1992 (aged 20)	(Pakistan Football Federation) Khan Research Laboratories
14	DF	Muhammad Hameed	7 September 1988 (aged 24)	(Pakistan Football Federation) Khan Research Laboratories
15	MF	Naveed Ahmed	12 November 1984 (aged 28)	(Pakistan Football Federation) Pakistan Air Force
16	MF	Muhammad Mujahid	20 July 1989 (aged 24)	(Pakistan Football Federation) Pakistan Air Force
17	FW	Saddam Hussain	4 October 1993 (aged 19)	(Pakistan Football Federation) Pakistan Airlines
19	DF	Yaqoob Butt	9 September 1988 (aged 24)	(Danish Football Association) Skovshoved IF
20	MF	Muhammad Riaz	10 March 1995 (aged 18)	(Pakistan Football Federation) K-Electric
21	MF	Muhammad Adil	9 July 1992 (aged 21)	(Pakistan Football Federation) Khan Research Laboratories
22	GK	Yousuf Butt	18 October 1989 (aged 23)	(Danish Football Association) Glostrup FK
23	DF	Faisal Iqbal	30 December 1981 (aged 31)	(Pakistan Football Federation) National Bank
25	DF	Zesh Rehman	14 October 1983 (aged 29)	(Football Association of Hong Kong, China) Kitchee SC
27	GK	Saqib Hanif	4 April 1994 (aged 19)	(Pakistan Football Federation) Khan Research Laboratories

== Group B ==
=== Afghanistan ===
Coach: (Afghanistan) Mohammad Yousef Kargar

No.	Pos.	Player	Date of birth (age)	Club
1	GK	Mansur Faqiryar	3 January 1986 (aged 27)	(German Football Association) VfB Oldenburg
2	DF	Muqadar Qazizadah	11 September 1988 (aged 24)	(Afghanistan) Shaheen Asmayee
3	DF	Zohib Islam Amiri	2 May 1987 (aged 26)	(All India Football Federation) Mumbai FC
5	DF	Ali Ahmad Yarzada	15 October 1985 (aged 27)	(Afghanistan) Toofaan Harirod
6	DF	Mohammad Rafi Barekzay	6 June 1990 (aged 23)	(Afghanistan) Ansari Herat FC
7	MF	Mustafa Azadzoy	24 July 1992 (aged 21)	(German Football Association) TB Uphusen
9	MF	Mohammad Mashriqi	7 July 1987 (aged 26)	(All India Football Federation) Bhawanipore
10	FW	Balal Arezou	28 December 1988 (aged 24)	(All India Football Federation) Churchill Brothers
11	MF	Sandjar Ahmadi	10 February 1992 (aged 21)	(German Football Association) SC Vier- und Marschlande
12	FW	Hashmatullah Barakzai	4 June 1987 (aged 26)	(Afghanistan) Firozi Kabul
13	FW	Hamidullah Karimi	6 February 1992 (aged 21)	(Afghanistan) Toofaan Harirod
14	DF	Farzad Ghulam		(Afghanistan) Toofaan Harirod
17	MF	Maruf Mohammadi	2 July 1993 (aged 20)	(Afghanistan) Toofaan Harirod
18	MF	Ahmad Arash Hatifi	13 March 1986 (aged 27)	(United States Soccer Federation) Bay Area Ambassadors
19	FW	Sidiq Walizada	25 September 1993 (aged 19)	(Royal Dutch Football Association) NBSVV
22	GK	Hamidullah Yousafzai	2 December 1981 (aged 31)	(Afghanistan) Shaheen Asmayee
24	FW	Amredin Sharifi	2 June 1992 (aged 21)	(Afghanistan) Istiqlal
25	FW	Mustafa Hadid	25 August 1987 (aged 26)	(German Football Association) Altona 93
27	DF	Mujtaba Faiz	21 November 1989 (aged 23)	(Afghanistan) Shaheen Asmayee
30	MF	Waheed Nadeem	2 June 1989 (aged 24)	(Afghanistan) Toofaan Harirod

=== Maldives ===
Coach: (Hungary) István Urbányi

No.	Pos.	Player	Date of birth (age)	Club
1	GK	Mohamed Imran	25 May 1988 (aged 25)	(Football Association of Maldives) Maziya
2	DF	Ahmed Abdulla	11 March 1987 (aged 26)	(Football Association of Maldives) New Radiant
3	DF	Mohamed Shifan	8 March 1983 (aged 30)	(Football Association of Maldives) New Radiant
5	MF	Ahmed Niyaz	17 March 1979 (aged 34)	(Football Association of Maldives) New Radiant
6	MF	Mohamed Arif	11 August 1985 (aged 28)	(Football Association of Maldives) Maziya
7	FW	Ali Ashfaq (c)	5 September 1985 (aged 27)	(Football Association of Maldives) New Radiant
8	DF	Rilwan Waheed	14 February 1991 (aged 22)	(Football Association of Maldives) New Radiant
9	FW	Assadhulla Abdulla	19 September 1990 (aged 22)	(Football Association of Maldives) Maziya
10	MF	Ali Umar	5 August 1980 (aged 33)	(Football Association of Maldives) New Radiant
11	MF	Ali Fasir	4 September 1988 (aged 24)	(Football Association of Maldives) New Radiant
12	MF	Ahmed Rasheed	8 July 1988 (aged 25)	(Football Association of Maldives) Maziya
13	DF	Akram Abdul Ghanee	19 March 1987 (aged 26)	(Football Association of Maldives) New Radiant
15	MF	Ismail Easa	19 December 1989 (aged 23)	(Football Association of Maldives) New Radiant
17	DF	Shafiu Ahmed	13 November 1988 (aged 24)	(Football Association of Maldives) Maziya
18	GK	Ibrahim Irfah Arif		(Football Association of Maldives) B.G. Sports Club
19	MF	Mohamed Rasheed	15 April 1985 (aged 28)	(Football Association of Maldives) Club Valencia
21	FW	Hassan Adhuham	8 January 1990 (aged 23)	(Football Association of Maldives) B.G. Sports Club
25	GK	Imran Mohamed	18 December 1980 (aged 32)	(Football Association of Maldives) New Radiant
30	MF	Ahmed Imaaz	12 April 1992 (aged 21)	(Football Association of Maldives) Club Eagles
37	MF	Mohamed Umair	3 July 1988 (aged 25)	(Football Association of Maldives) New Radiant

=== Sri Lanka ===
Coach: (Brazil) Cláudio Roberto

No.	Pos.	Player	Date of birth (age)	Club
1	GK	Dasun Paranavithana	10 November 1991 (aged 21)	(Football Federation of Sri Lanka) Air Force SC
3	DF	Sanka Danushka	28 December 1984 (aged 28)	(Football Federation of Sri Lanka) Army
5	DF	Mohamed Sameer	5 April 1991 (aged 22)	(Football Federation of Sri Lanka) Renown
6	FW	Mohamed Izzadeen	8 June 1981 (aged 32)	(Football Federation of Sri Lanka) Army
7	MF	Tuwan Rizni	16 June 1990 (aged 23)	(Football Federation of Sri Lanka) Colombo FC
8	DF	Lahiru Tharaka	20 April 1989 (aged 24)	(Football Federation of Sri Lanka) Ratnam
9	MF	Mohamed Fazal		(Football Federation of Sri Lanka) Renown
10	MF	Chathura Gunaratne	8 September 1982 (aged 30)	(Football Federation of Sri Lanka) Renown
11	MF	Nipuna Bandara	17 June 1991 (aged 22)	(Football Federation of Sri Lanka) Air Force SC
12	FW	Mohamed Nafeer		(Football Federation of Sri Lanka) Renown
13	FW	Chathuranga Sanjeewa	7 June 1991 (aged 22)	(Football Federation of Sri Lanka) Navy SC
14	MF	Raumy Mohideen	5 June 1979 (aged 34)	(Football Federation of Sri Lanka) Colombo FC
16	DF	Bandara Warakagoda	13 October 1986 (aged 26)	(Football Federation of Sri Lanka) Renown
17	DF	Suranda Bandara	28 May 1988 (aged 25)	(Football Federation of Sri Lanka) Solid SC
19	FW	Sudarshana Gunasinghe		(Football Federation of Sri Lanka) Navy SC
21	MF	Sanoj Sameera	3 September 1989 (aged 23)	(Football Federation of Sri Lanka) Saunders SC
22	GK	Mohamed Imran	11 February 1980 (aged 33)	(Football Federation of Sri Lanka) Renown
23	DF	Tharindu Eranga	30 May 1990 (aged 23)	(Football Federation of Sri Lanka) Ratnam
25	GK	Sujan Perera	18 July 1989 (aged 24)	(Football Federation of Sri Lanka) Army
30	MF	H.D.M. de Silva	16 November 1993 (aged 19)	(Football Federation of Sri Lanka) Army

=== Bhutan ===
Coach: (Japan) Kazunori Ohara

No.	Pos.	Player	Date of birth (age)	Club
1	GK	Leki Dukpa	9 December 1989 (aged 23)	(Bhutan Football Federation) Drukpol
2	FW	Diwash Subba	9 March 1989 (aged 24)	(Bhutan Football Federation) Yeedzin
3	DF	Dawa Gyeltshen	7 June 1986 (aged 27)	(Bhutan Football Federation) Yeedzin
4	DF	Pema Dorji	5 July 1985 (aged 28)	(Bhutan Football Federation) Yeedzin
5	FW	Passang Tshering	16 July 1983 (aged 30)	(Bhutan Football Federation) Thimphu City
6	FW	Sonam Tenzin	20 October 1986 (aged 26)	(Bhutan Football Federation) Drukpol
7	FW	Chencho Gyeltshen	15 December 1990 (aged 22)	(Bhutan Football Federation) Yeedzin
8	MF	Nima Sangay	1 January 1984 (aged 29)	(Bhutan Football Federation) Drukpol
9	FW	Ugyen Dorji	23 December 1992 (aged 20)	(Bhutan Football Federation) Thimphu City
10	MF	Sonam Yoezer	24 October 1994 (aged 18)	(Bhutan Football Federation) Yeedzin
11	DF	Chencho Nio	3 March 1986 (aged 27)	(Bhutan Football Federation) Yeedzin
13	FW	Tshering Wangdi	27 January 1992 (aged 21)	(Bhutan Football Federation) Yeedzin
15	FW	Yeshey Dorji	2 January 1989 (aged 24)	(Bhutan Football Federation) Yeedzin
16	MF	Tshering Dorji	10 September 1993 (aged 19)	(Bhutan Football Federation) Thimphu City
17	DF	Pema Rinchen	20 February 1986 (aged 27)	(Bhutan Football Federation) Dzongree
18	MF	Biren Basnet	20 October 1994 (aged 18)	(Bhutan Football Federation) Thimphu City
19	DF	Man Bahadur Gurung	15 March 1993 (aged 20)	(Bhutan Football Federation) Druk Star
21	GK	Migma Tshering		(Bhutan Football Federation) Thimphu City
22	GK	Hemlal Bhattrai	1 November 1990 (aged 22)	(Bhutan Football Federation) Druk Stars
23	DF	Karun Gurung	9 June 1986 (aged 27)	(Bhutan Football Federation) Thimphu City
