= List of Afghan Premier League clubs =

The following is a list of clubs who have played in the Afghan Premier League since its formation in 2012 to the current season.

As of the 2020, eight teams have played in the Afghan Premier League.

== Table ==
All statistics here refer to time in the Afghan Premier League only. Afghan Premier League teams playing in the 2021 season are indicated in bold, while founding members of the Premier League are shown in italics.

Club	Location	Total seasons	Seasons	Most recent finish (group)	Highest finish
De Abasin Sape	Khost	9	2012–	3rd (A)	2nd
De Maiwand Atalan	Kandahar	9	2012–	3rd (B)	1st
De Spin Ghar Bazan	Jalalabad	9	2012–	2nd (A)	1st
Mawjhai Amu	Kunduz	9	2012–	4th (A)	1st
Oqaban Hindukush	Ghazni	9	2012–	4th (B)	1st
Shaheen Asmayee	Kabul	9	2012–	1st (B)	1st
Simorgh Alborz	Mazar-i-Sharif	9	2012–	2nd (B)	2nd
Toofan Harirod	Herat	9	2012–	1st (A)	1st

== Location of all clubs who have competed in the Afghan Premier League ==
Location of Afghan Premier League teams
