= 2015 Afghan Premier League =

Afghan Premier League
- Season: 2015
- Champions: De Spin Ghar Bazan (1st title)
- Matches: 18
- Goals: 51 (2.83 per match)
- Top goalscorer: Mustafa Afshar (5 goals)
- Highest scoring: Mawjhai Amu 1–5 De Maiwand Atalan F.C. (1 Oct 2015)
- Highest attendance: 5,000; The Final (2 Oct 2015)
- Average attendance: 1,500

The 2015 Afghan Premier League was the fourth season of Afghan Premier League, the Afghan league for association football clubs, launched in 2012. Shaheen Asmayee F.C. were the defending champions of the league. The season started on 27 August 2015 with the 8 teams again divided into two groups. Shaheen Asmayee again reached the Afghan Premier League final and faced off against De Spin Ghar Bazan F.C. It was the first time De Spin Ghar reached the final of the league, winning it 4-3 on penalties, after neither had managed to score until the end of the extra time. Eight yellow cards were handed out in the final.

== Teams ==
- Shaheen Asmayee F.C. (Falcon of Asmayee), Greater Kabul Region.
- Toofaan Harirod F.C. (Harirood Storm), Western region.
- Simorgh Alborz F.C. (Alborz Phoenix), North Western region.
- Oqaban Hindukush F.C. (Hindukush Eagles), Central region
- Mawjhai Amu F.C. (Amu Waves), North Eastern region.
- De Maiwand Atalan F.C. (Maiwand Champions), Southern region.
- De Spin Ghar Bazan F.C. (Spin Ghar Goshawk), Eastern region.
- De Abasin Sape F.C. (Abasin Waves), South Eastern region.

== Group stage ==
=== Group A ===
Team	Pld	W	D	L	GF	GA	GD	Pts
De Spin Ghar Bazan	3	2	1	0	7	3	+4	7
Mawjhai Amu	3	2	1	0	3	3	+0	7
Oqaban Hindukush	3	1	1	2	2	3	−1	4
De Abasin Sape	3	0	1	2	2	5	−3	1

28 August 2015	Oqaban Hindukush F.C.	1–1	De Abasin Sape F.C.	AFF Stadium, Kabul
16:00 AFT	Mahdi Behzad 92'	Report	Mohammad Nawaz Zazai 77'

2 September 2015	De Spin Ghar Bazan F.C.	2–2	Mawjhai Amu F.C.	AFF Stadium, Kabul
16:00 AFT	Mohammad Fahim Afkar 22', 49'	Report	Abdul Manan Farahi 56' (o.g.); Hedayatullah Ahmadi 90' (pen.)

4 September 2015	Oqaban Hindukush F.C.	1–0	Mawjhai Amu F.C.	AFF Stadium, Kabul
16:00 AFT	Basir Haber 85'	Report

10 September 2015	De Spin Ghar Bazan F.C.	3–1	De Abasin Sape F.C.	AFF Stadium, Kabul
16:00 AFT	Mohammad Fahim Afkar 35'; Shafaq Ayabi 40' hamid Habibi 80'	Report	Mohammad Ahmadi 7'; Farhad Totakhil (red card) 82'

16 September 2015	Oqaban Hindukush F.C.	0–2	De Spin Ghar Bazan F.C.	AFF Stadium, Kabul
16:00 AFT	Zmaray Salangi (yellow card) 20'; Basir haber (yellow card) 55' (yellow-red card) 94'	Report	Faqeer Husain Himati 28'; Amanullah Sardary (yellow card) 42'; Ahmad Reshad Hassanzadeh 90'

18 September 2015	Mawjhai Amu F.C.	1–0	De Abasin Sape F.C.	AFF Stadium, Kabul
16:00 AFT	Qesmat Ahmadi 69', (yellow card) 69' hedayatullah Ahmadi (red card) 69'; Abdul Qayoom Dawlatzai (yellow card) 82'	Report	Sohrab Niazi (yellow card) 53' (yellow-red card) 84'; Hidayat Qureshi (yellow card) 66'; Mohammad Nawaz Zazai (yellow card) 82'; Rahmat Ahmadzai (yellow card) 88'

=== Group B ===
Team	Pld	W	D	L	GF	GA	GD	Pts
Shaheen Asmayee	3	2	0	1	5	3	+2	6
De Maiwand Atalan	3	1	1	1	4	4	+0	4
Toofaan Harirod	3	1	1	1	5	7	−2	4
Simorgh Alborz	3	1	0	2	6	6	+2	3

27 August 2015	Shaheen Asmayee F.C.	1–3	Simorgh Alborz F.C.	AFF Stadium, Kabul
16:00 AFT	Muhammadi 61'	Report	Nadim 4', 24'; Mustafa Rezaei 76'

29 August 2015	Toofaan Harirod F.C.	2–2	De Maiwand Atalan F.C.	AFF Stadium, Kabul
16:00 AFT	Mohammad Rafi Barikzai 9'; Bashir Ahmad Azadani 80'	Report	Sayed Baqer Mir Salimi 24'; Farzad Ataie 57'

3 September 2015	Shaheen Asmayee F.C.	3–0	Toofaan Harirod F.C.	AFF Stadium, Kabul
16:00 AFT	Hashmatullah Barakzai 5'; Salim Saifi 68'; Reza Allahyari 70'	Report

9 September 2015	De Maiwand Atalan F.C.	2–1	Simorgh Alborz F.C.	AFF Stadium, Kabul
16:00 AFT	Mustafa Afshar 21'; Masoud 94'	Report	Ahmad Farhad Adil 87'

11 September 2015	Shaheen Asmayee F.C.	1–0	De Maiwand Atalan F.C.	AFF Stadium, Kabul
16:00 AFT	Samiullah Muhammadi 7' (pen.)			Referee: Halim Aqa Sherzad

17 September 2015	Toofaan Harirod F.C.	3–2	Simorgh Alborz F.C.	AFF Stadium, Kabul
16:00 AFT	Rahmatullah Khair Khwah 25', 87'; Ghulam Yaqubi Yaqoobi (yellow card) 23', (goal) 30'; Mohammad Yama Yahyazada (red card) 80'	Report	Monerulhaq Nadim (yellow card) 24', (goal) 52', 89'; Timor Shah Ghafori (yellow card) 63'; Zarif Amiri (yellow card) 79'; Mohammad Nasim Muradi (yellow card) 88'; Ahmad farhad Adil (yellow card) 93'

== Semi finals ==
26 September 2015
15:30 AFT
Semi Final

De Spinghar Bazan	0–1	De Maiwand Atalan
	Report	Sayed Baqer Mir Salimi (yellow card) 42', (goal) 50'

AFF Stadium, Kabul
Attendance: 3,500 (estimated)
28 September 2015
15:30 AFT
Semi Final

De Maiwand Atalan	1–2 (a.e.t.)	De Spin Ghar Bazan
Mohammad Salim Naimi (yellow card) 53'; Wahid Nadim (yellow card) 62'; Farzad Ataie (yellow card) 81'; Asadullah Rezae 85'; Housain Alizada (yellow card) 114'	Report	Ghulam hazrat Niazi (yellow card) 50'; Faqeer Hussain Himati 55'; Mohammad Fahim Afkar 59'; Shafaq Ayabi (yellow card) 66'
Penalties
Wahid (penalty scored); Baqer (penalty scored)	2–4	(penalty scored) Rohid; (penalty scored) Faqeer; (penalty scored) Hamidullah; (penalty scored) Ghulam

AFF Stadium, Kabul
Attendance: 3,500 (estimated)

27 September 2015
15:30 AFT
Semi Final

Shaheen Asmayee	3–2	Mawjhai Amu
Samiullah Muhammadi 2'; Sayed Mohammad Hashimi 48'; Hashmatullah Barakzai 67' (pen.); Mujtaba Faiz (yellow card) 81'; Abdul Wakeel Kamalpoori (yellow card) 90'; Muqadar Qazizadah (yellow card) 95'	Report	Masoud Qarizada (yellow card) 34', (goal) 49'; Abdul Qayoom Dawlatzai (yellow card) 59'; Basir Ahmad Nasiri (yellow card) 69'; Qesmat Ahmadi 76'

AFF Stadium, Kabul
Attendance: 3,500 (estimated)
29 September 2015
14:30 AFT
Semi Final

Mawjhai Amu	1–1	Shaheen Asmayee
Basir Ahmad Nasiri (yellow card) 20'; Masoud Qarizada 34' hedayatullah Ahmadi (yellow card) 53'; Mohammad Jafar Siddiqi (yellow card) 71'; Qesmat Ahmadi (yellow card) 73'	Report	Hashmatullah Barakzai 9'

AFF Stadium, Kabul
Attendance: 4,000 (estimated)

== Consolation (third place) ==
1 October 2015
14:30 AFT
Third place

Mawjhai Amu	1–5	De Maiwand Atalan
Fazil Rahman Mohammadi (yellow card) 48'; Kanoosh Khawari 75'	Report	Mustafa Afshar 2', 9', 57', 91'; Mohammad Salim Naimi (yellow card) 6', (goal) 81'

AFF Stadium, Kabul
Attendance: 3,000

== Final ==
2 October 2015
14:30 AFT
Final

Shaheen Asmayee	0–0 (a.e.t.)	De Spin Ghar Bazan
Sayed Maqsood (yellow card) 88'; Hashmatullah (yellow card) 92'; Muqadar (yellow card) 106'; Mahmood Azad (yellow card) 108'	Report	Abdullah Abdali (yellow card) 99'; Shir Ali (yellow card) 106'; Ahmad Reshad (yellow card) 117'; Abdul Manan Azimi (yellow card) 122'
Penalties
Samiullah (penalty scored); Fardeen (penalty scored); Hashmatullah (penalty scored)	3–4	(penalty scored) Rohid; (penalty scored) Abdul Manan; (penalty scored) Ghulam; (penalty scored) Ahmad reshad

AFF Stadium, Kabul
Attendance: 5,000
Referee: Halim Aqa Sherzad

== Statistics ==
=== Final standing ===
→ At the gates, and points to the final round is involved, victory on penalties are a draw.

Rank	Club	Goals	Difference	Points
1	(Afghanistan) De Spin Ghar Bazan	10:5	+5	13
2	(Afghanistan) Shaheen Asmayee	9:6	+3	10
3	(Afghanistan) De Maiwand Atalan	11:8	+3	10
4	(Afghanistan) Mawjhai Amu	7:12	–5	5
5	(Afghanistan) Oqaban Hindukush	2:3	–1	4
6	(Afghanistan) Toofaan Harirod	5:7	–2	4
7	(Afghanistan) Simorgh Alborz	6:6	±0	3
8	(Afghanistan) De Abasin Sape	2:5	–3	1

=== Top scorers ===
As of 19 September 2015.

Rank	Scorer	Club	Goals
1	Mustafa Afshar	De Maiwand Atalan	5
2	Monerulhaq Nadim	Simorgh Alborz	4
3	Mohammad Fahim Afkar	De Spin Ghar Bazan	4
4	Hashmatullah Barakzai	Shaheen Asmayee	3

== Hat-tricks ==
Player	For	Against	Result	Date	Ref.
(Afghanistan) Mustafa Afshar ^{4}	De Maiwand Atalan F.C.	Mawjhai Amu F.C.	5–1 (A)	1 October 2015	

== TV Rights ==
All matches of the APL are aired live by two private channels in Afghanistan, namely Tolo TV and Lemar TV. Arman FM and Arakozia FM offer live commentary of the match through the country. Matches are also available live on the world's largest video sharing website YouTube on the league's official YouTube page.

== Sponsors ==
Roshan Telecom is the title sponsor of Afghan Premier League after which it is named as Roshan Afghan Premier League. Official Partners of Afghan Premier League are Afghanistan International Bank and Hummel International which provided kit for the teams.
