= 2020 Afghan Premier League =

Season of Afghan association football

Afghan Premier League
- Season: 2020
- Dates: 24 September – 16 October 2020
- Champions: Shaheen Asmayee F.C.
- Matches played: 15
- Goals scored: 43 (2.87 per match)
- Best Player: Fardin Hakimi (Shaheen Asmayee)
- Top goalscorer: Javid Mirzad (Oqaban Hindukush F.C.); Mostafa Rezaei (Simorgh Alborz F.C.) (3 goals each)
- Best goalkeeper: Kawash Haidari (Shaheen Asmayee)
- Biggest home win: Simorgh Alborz 5–0 Oqaban Hindukush (29 September 2020)
- Biggest away win: Mawjhai Amu 1–3 De Abasin Sape (8 October 2020); Toofaan Harirod 0–2 Simorgh Alborz (13 October 2020)
- Highest scoring: Simorgh Alborz 5–0 Oqaban Hindukush (29 September 2020); Toofaan Harirod 4-1 Mawjhai Amu (30 September 2020); De Spin Ghar Bazan 4-1 De Abasin Sape (2 October 2020)
- Longest winning run: Toofaan Harirod; Shaheen Asmayee (3 matches)
- Longest unbeaten run: Shaheen Asmayee (5 matches)
- Longest winless run: De Maiwand Atalan; Mawjhai Amu; Oqaban Hindukush (3 matches)
- Longest losing run: Mawjhai Amu (3 matches)

The 2020 Afghan Premier League was the ninth season of Afghan Premier League, the Afghan league for association football clubs, since its establishment in 2012. The season commenced on 24 September 2020. Shaheen Asmayee won their fifth title, defeating Simorgh Alborz in the final, 1–0.

== Teams ==
The following eight teams, which represent the country's eight main regions, participated in the 2020 Afghan Premier League.

Location football club of Afghan Premier League
- De Abasin Sape
- De Maiwand Atalan
- De Spin Ghar Bazan
- Mawjhai Amu
- Oqaban Hindukush
- Shaheen Asmayee
- Simorgh Alborz
- Toofaan Harirod

== Group stage ==
The draw for the group stage was held on 18 September 2020.

=== Group A ===
Pos	Team	Pld	W	D	L	GF	GA	GD	Pts	Qualification	TFH	DSB	DAS	MHA
1	Toofaan Harirod	3	3	0	0	7	1	+6	9	Qualification for Knockout stage	—	2–0	1–0	4–1
2	De Spin Ghar Bazan	3	2	0	1	5	3	+2	6	Qualification for Knockout stage	—	—	4–1	1–0
3	De Abasin Sape	3	1	0	2	4	6	−2	3		—	—	—	—
4	Mawjhai Amu	3	0	0	3	2	8	−6	0		—	—	1–3	—

Source: APL

24 September 2020	Toofaan Harirod	1–0	De Abasin Sape	Kabul
19:00 AFT (UTC+04:30)	Khairkhah 48'			Stadium: AFF Stadium

28 September 2020	De Spin Ghar Bazan	1-0	Mawjhai Amu	Kabul
16:00 AFT (UTC+04:30)	Wojody 12'			Stadium: AFF Stadium

30 September 2020	Toofaan Harirod	4–1	Mawjhai Amu	Kabul
16:00 AFT (UTC+04:30)	Kamali 9'; Mohammadi 17' (pen.); Ahmadi 23', 53'		Houshang 66'	Stadium: AFF Stadium; Referee: Halim Agha Shirzad

2 October 2020	De Spin Ghar Bazan	4-1	De Abasin Sape	Kabul
18:00 AFT (UTC+04:30)	Naderi 21', 37'; Sadiq 56', 70'		Vahidullah 60'	Stadium: AFF Stadium

6 October 2020	Toofaan Harirod	2–0	De Spin Ghar Bazan	Kabul
16:00 AFT (UTC+04:30)	Kamali 45'; Mohammadi 73'			Stadium: AFF Stadium

8 October 2020	Mawjhai Amu	1–3	De Abasin Sape	Kabul
15:00 AFT (UTC+04:30)	Afghan 63'		Mehmand 80'; Tohidi 83'; Azizi 87'	Stadium: AFF Stadium

=== Group B ===
Pos	Team	Pld	W	D	L	GF	GA	GD	Pts	Qualification	SHA	SMA	DMA	OBH
1	Shaheen Asmayee	3	2	1	0	7	2	+5	7	Qualification for Knockout stage	—	3–1	3–0	1–1
2	Simorgh Alborz	3	1	1	1	7	4	+3	4	Qualification for Knockout stage	—	—	1–1	5–0
3	De Maiwand Atalan	3	0	2	1	3	6	−3	2		—	—	—	—
4	Oqaban Hindukush	3	0	2	1	3	8	−5	2		—	—	2–2	—

Source: APL

25 September 2020	Shaheen Asmayee	3–0	De Maiwand Atalan	Kabul
18:00 AFT (UTC+04:30)	Afshar 26'; Sharifi 60'; Farooq 89'			Stadium: AFF Stadium; Referee: Halim Agha Shirzad

29 September 2020	Simorgh Alborz	5-0	Oqaban Hindukush	Kabul
16:00 AFT (UTC+04:30)	Hanifi 31'; Rezaei 33', 55'; Kohy 80', 84'			Stadium: AFF Stadium

1 October 2020	Shaheen Asmayee	1–1	Oqaban Hindukush	Kabul
18:00 AFT (UTC+04:30)	Afzli 53'		Mirzad 34'	Stadium: AFF Stadium

5 October 2020	Simorgh Alborz	1-1	De Maiwand Atalan	Kabul
16:00 AFT (UTC+04:30)	Hanifi 7'		Qadri 47'	Stadium: AFF Stadium; Referee: Halim Agha Shirzad

7 October 2020	Shaheen Asmayee	3-1	Simorgh Alborz	Kabul
16:00 AFT (UTC+04:30)	Akbari 22', 46'; Habibi 29'		Karimi 24'	Stadium: AFF Stadium; Referee: Halim Agha Shirzad

9 October 2020	Oqaban Hindukush	2-2	De Maiwand Atalan	Kabul
18:00 AFT (UTC+04:30)	Mirzad 53', 83'		Qadri 18'; Norzi 90+1'	Stadium: AFF Stadium

== Knockout stage ==
Semi-finals
12 October
Shaheen Asmayee	2
De Spin Ghar Bazan	0
13 October
Toofaan Harirod	0
Simorgh Alborz	2

Final
16 October
Shaheen Asmayee	1
Simorgh Alborz	0

=== Semi-finals ===
12 October 2020
18:00 AFT (UTC+04:30)

Shaheen Asmayee	2–0	De Spin Ghar Bazan
Sardari 40'; Habibi 90+3'

AFF Stadium, Kabul
Referee: Halim Agha Shirzad

13 October 2020
18:00 AFT (UTC+04:30)

Toofaan Harirod	0–2	Simorgh Alborz
		Karimi 58'; Rezaei 86'

AFF Stadium, Kabul

=== Final ===
16 October 2020
18:00 AFT (UTC+04:30)

Shaheen Asmayee	1–0	Simorgh Alborz
Hakimi 20'

AFF Stadium, Kabul
