= 2016 Afghan Premier League =

Afghan Premier League
- Season: 2016
- Champions: Shaheen Asmayee (3rd title)
- AFC Cup: Shaheen Asmayee

The 2016 Afghan Premier League tournament was the fifth edition of Afghan Premier League annual association football club competitions established in 2012. The tournament started on 25 August 2016 with the same 8 team and two groups configuration as the 2016 tournament.

De Spin Ghar Bazan F.C. unsuccessfully defended in Group B their 2015 title taking a fourth place. Shaheen Asmayee successfully pursued its third League title on 30 September 2016 against De Maiwand Atalan, 2–1. Shaheen Asmayee qualified for the 2017 AFC Cup, the first time an Afghan team was to compete in the AFC Cup.

== Group stage ==
=== Group A ===
Pos	Team	Pld	W	D	L	GF	GA	GD	Pts	Qualification
1	Shaheen Asmayee	3	2	0	1	6	2	+4	6	Qualification to Semi finals
2	De Maiwand Atalan	3	2	0	1	4	1	+3	6 (Note: De Maiwand Atalan won head-to-head tiebreaker)	Qualification to Semi finals
3	Toofaan Harirod	3	2	0	1	4	1	+3	6	
4	De Abasin Sape	3	0	0	3	0	10	−10	0	

Source: Soccerway

=== Group B ===
Pos	Team	Pld	W	D	L	GF	GA	GD	Pts	Qualification
1	Mawjhal Amu	3	2	0	1	4	4	0	6	Qualification to Semi finals
2	Simorgh Alborz	3	1	1	1	7	5	+2	4	Qualification to Semi finals
3	Oqaban Hindukush	3	1	1	1	2	2	0	4	
4	De Spin Ghar Bazan	3	0	2	1	2	4	−2	2	

Source: Soccerway

== Playoff Stage ==
=== Semifinals ===
==== First legs ====
22 September 2016

Shaheen Asmayee	8–1	Simorgh Alborz

23 September 2016

Mawjhal Amu	2–3	De Maiwand Atalan

==== Second legs ====
25 September 2016

Simorgh Alborz	3–2	Shaheen Asmayee

26 September 2016

De Maiwand Atalan	2–0	Mawjhal Amu

=== Third-place match ===
29 September 2016

Mawjhal Amu	0–1	Simorgh Alborz

=== Final ===
30 September 2016

Shaheen Asmayee	2–1	De Maiwand Atalan
