= 2012 Afghan Premier League =

First season of the Afgan Premier Leagues

Afghan Premier League
- Season: 2012
- Dates: 8 September 2012 – 19 October 2012
- Champions: Toofan Harirod
- Matches played: 16
- Goals scored: 62 (3.88 per match)
- Top goalscorer: Hamidullah Karimi (9)
- Biggest home win: Toofan Harirod 4–0 Oqaban Hindukush (26 September 2012); Toofan Harirod 4–0 Mawjhai Amu (5 October 2012)
- Biggest away win: De Spin Ghar Bazan 0–10 Toofaan Harirod (12 October 2012)
- Highest scoring: De Spin Ghar Bazan 0–10 Toofaan Harirod (12 October 2012)

The 2012 Afghan Premier League was the first season of the Afghan Premier League, the Afghan league for association football clubs, which was established in 2012.

== Teams ==
Eight teams competed in the league – four of which selected in a different group. All 8 teams were spread out across Afghanistan, but all the matches were played at the Afghanistan Football Federation stadium in Kabul.

Note: Table lists in alphabetical order.

=== Clubs and locations ===
Team	Location	Group
De Abasin Sape	Khost	A
De Maiwand Atalan	Kandahar	A
De Spin Ghar Bazan	Jalalabad	A
Mawjhai Amu	Kunduz	B
Owaban Hindukush	Ghazni	B
Shaheen Asmayee	Kabul	A
Simorgh Alborz	Mazar-i-Sharif	B
Toofan Harirod	Herat	B

== Group 1 ==
=== League table ===
Team	Pld	W	D	L	GF	GA	GD	Pts	Qualification
De Maiwand Atalan	3	2	1	0	7	2	+5	7	Semi-final
De Spin Ghar Bazan	3	2	1	0	3	1	+2	7	Semi-final
Shaheen Asmayee	3	1	0	2	4	4	0	3	
De Abasin Sape	3	0	0	3	0	7	-7	0	

=== Matches ===
18.09.2012	De Maiwand Atalan F.C.	3-1	Shaheen Asmayee F.C.	AFF Stadium, Kabul
15:30

20.09.2012	De Abasin Sape F.C.	0-1	De Spin Ghar Bazan F.C.	AFF Stadium, Kabul
15:30

25.09.2012	Shaheen Asmayee F.C.	0-1	De Spin Ghar Bazan F.C.	AFF Stadium, Kabul
15:30

27.09.2012	De Maiwand Atalan F.C.	3-0	De Abasin Sape F.C.	AFF Stadium, Kabul
15:30

02.10.2012	De Maiwand Atalan F.C.	1-1	De Spin Ghar Bazan F.C.	AFF Stadium, Kabul
15:30

04.10.2012	Shaheen Asmayee F.C.	3 - 0	De Abasin Sape F.C.	AFF Stadium, Kabul
15:30

== Group 2 ==
=== League table ===
Team	Pld	W	D	L	GF	GA	GD	Pts	Qualification
Toofan Harirod	3	3	0	0	12	1	+11	9	Semi-final
Simorgh Alborz	3	2	0	1	7	7	0	6	Semi-final
Oqaban Hindukosh	3	0	1	2	3	8	-5	1	
Mawjhai Amu	3	0	1	2	4	10	-6	1	

=== Matches ===
19.09.2012	Mawjhai Amu F.C.	2-2	Oqaban Hindukush F.C.	AFF Stadium, Kabul
15:30

21.09.2012	Simorgh Alborz F.C.	1-4	Toofaan Harirod F.C.	AFF Stadium, Kabul
15:30

26.09.2012	Toofaan Harirod F.C.	4-0	Oqaban Hindukush F.C.	AFF Stadium, Kabul
15:30

28.09.2012	Simorgh Alborz F.C.	4-2	Mawjhai Amu F.C.	AFF Stadium, Kabul
15:30

03.10.2012	Simorgh Alborz F.C.	2-1	Oqaban Hindukush F.C.	AFF Stadium, Kabul
15:30

05.10.2012	Toofaan Harirod F.C.	4-0	Mawjhai Amu F.C.	AFF Stadium, Kabul
15:30

== Finals series ==
Semi-finals
11 October — Kabul
De Maiwand Atalan	1
Simorgh Alborz	2
12 October — Kabul
De Spinghar Bazan	0
Toofaan Harirood	10

Final
19 October 2012 — Kabul
Simorgh Alborz	1
Toofaan Harirood	2

=== Semi-finals ===
11 October 2012	De Maiwand Atalan F.C.	1 - 2	Simorgh Alborz F.C.	AFF Stadium, Kabul
14:30	Noorzai, 75'		Nadim 25', 51'	Referee: Hamidullah Yuzofzai

12 October 2012	De Spin Ghar Bazan F.C.	0 - 10	Toofaan Harirod F.C.	AFF Stadium, Kabul
14:30			Yaqoubi 22', 84', 55'; Karimi 49', 57'; Mohammadi 39'; Nadim 56'; Majid Karimi 71'; Jazemi 83'; Barakzai 87'	Attendance: 9000

=== Final ===
19 October 2012
14:30

Simorgh Alborz F.C.	1-2	Toofaan Harirod F.C.

AFF Stadium, Kabul
Referee: Hamidullah Yousafzai

== Season statistics ==
=== Scoring ===
==== Top scorers ====
Rank.	Player	Team	Goals
1	Hamidullah Karimi	Tofan Harirod	9
2	Gholam Reza Yaqoubi	Tofan Harirod	7
3	Munirulhaq Nadim	Simorgh Alborz	5
4	Abdul Wahid Noorzai	De Maiwand Atalan	4
5	Wahidullah Nadim	Tofan Harirod	3
	Mustafa Zhobel	De Maiwand Atalan	3

=== Own goals ===
Rank	Player	Club (against)	Own goals
1	Mujtaba Faiz	Shaheen Asmayee (De Spinghar Bazan)	1
