= 2014 Afghan Premier League =

Afghan Premier League
- Season: 2014
- Champions: Shaheen Asmayee
- Matches played: 17
- Goals scored: 70 (4.12 per match)
- Top goalscorer: M. Riza Rizayee (6)
- Highest scoring: De Spinghar Bazan 5-5 De Maiwand Atalan (2 Oct 2014)

The 2014 Afghan Premier League is the third season of Afghan Premier League, the Afghan league for association football clubs, since its establishment in 2012. The season started on 28 August 2014 with the group stage. Shaheen Asmayee enters the season as the defending champions, having defeated Simorgh Alborz 3–1 in the 2013 final. It was Shaheen's first title and championship, with Simorgh's second runner up title, after two seasons in a row making it to the final of the country's league football.

== Teams ==
A total of eight teams competed in the league, divided into two groups of four in the 18-game league. There is no promotion or relegation system for the league.

=== Teams and locations ===
| Team | Region | Group |
|---|---|---|
| De Abasin Sape F.C. | Southeast | Group B |
| De Maiwand Atalan F.C. | South | Group A |
| De Spin Ghar Bazan F.C. | East | Group A |
| Mawjhai Amu F.C. | Northeast | Group B |
| Oqaban Hindukush F.C. | Central | Group B |
| Shaheen Asmayee | Kabul | Group B |
| Simorgh Alborz F.C. | Northwest | Group A |
| Toofaan Harirood F.C. | West | Group A |

== Group stage ==
=== Group A ===
| Team | Pld | W | D | L | GF | GA | GD | Pts | Qualification |
|---|---|---|---|---|---|---|---|---|---|
| De Spin Ghar Bazan | 3 | 2 | 1 | 0 | 4 | 2 | +2 | 7 | Semi-Finals |
| De Maiwand Atalan | 3 | 2 | 0 | 1 | 5 | 2 | +3 | 6 | Semi-Finals |
| Toofaan Harirod | 3 | 1 | 1 | 1 | 4 | 4 | 0 | 4 | |
| Simorgh Alborz | 3 | 0 | 0 | 3 | 3 | 8 | −5 | 0 | |

| 29 August 2014 | Simorgh Alborz | 1 – 3 | De Maiwand Atalan | AFF Stadium, Kabul |
| 16:00 AFT | Farhad | | Irfan; Irfan; Fazli |

| 3 September 2014 | Toofaan Harirod | 1 – 1 | De Spin Ghar Bazan | AFF Stadium, Kabul |
| 16:00 AFT |

| 5 September 2014 | Simorgh Alborz | 1 – 2 | De Spin Ghar Bazan | AFF Stadium, Kabul |
| 16:00 AFT |

| 11 September 2014 | Toofaan Harirod | 0 – 2 | De Maiwand Atalan | AFF Stadium, Kabul |
| 16:00 AFT |

| 17 September 2014 | Simorgh Alborz | 1 – 3 | Toofaan Harirod | AFF Stadium, Kabul |
| 16:00 AFT |

| 19 September 2014 | De Spin Ghar Bazan | 1 – 0 | De Maiwand Atalan | AFF Stadium, Kabul |
| 16:00 AFT |

=== Group B ===
| Team | Pld | W | D | L | GF | GA | GD | Pts | Qualification |
|---|---|---|---|---|---|---|---|---|---|
| Oqaban Hindukush | 3 | 3 | 0 | 0 | 12 | 4 | +8 | 9 | Semi-Finals |
| Shaheen Asmayee | 3 | 2 | 0 | 1 | 10 | 5 | +5 | 6 | Semi-Finals |
| Mawjhai Amu | 3 | 1 | 0 | 2 | 6 | 10 | −4 | 3 | |
| De Abasin Sape | 3 | 0 | 0 | 3 | 2 | 12 | −10 | 0 | |

| 28 August 2014 | Shaheen Asmayee | 5 – 1 | De Abasin Sape | AFF Stadium, Kabul |
| 16:00 AFT | Sharifi 10'; Afshar 12'; Barakzai 49'; Afshar 52'; Barakzai 86' | Report | 44' Zazai |

| 30 August 2014 | Oqaban Hindukush | 5 – 2 | Mawjhai Amu | AFF Stadium, Kabul |
| 16:00 AFT | Aseer; Akbari; Rizayee; Akbari; Salangi | | Masoud; Lal Pacha |

| 4 September 2014 | Shaheen Asmayee | 4 – 2 | Mawjhai Amu | AFF Stadium, Kabul |
| 16:00 AFT | Sharifi 13'; Najafi 17'; Afshar 26'; Barakzai 35' | | 6'; 90+1' |

| 10 September 2014 | Oqaban Hindukush | 5 – 1 | De Abasin Sape | AFF Stadium, Kabul |
| 16:00 AFT |

| 12 September 2014 | Shaheen Asmayee | 1 – 2 | Oqaban Hindukush | AFF Stadium, Kabul |
| 16:00 AFT | Afshar 22' | | 13'; 26' |

| 18 September 2014 | Mawjhai Amu | 2 – 0 | De Abasin Sape | AFF Stadium, Kabul |
| 15:00 AFT |

== Knockout stage ==
Semifinals
1 | De Maiwand Atalan | 1 | 1 (7)
4 | Oqaban Hindukush (p) | 1 | 1 (8)
3 | Shaheen Asmayee | 1 | 3
2 | De Spinghar Bazan | 1 | 0

Finals
Oqaban Hindukush | 2
Shaheen Asmayee | 3

=== Semi-finals ===
| 22 September 2014 | Oqaban Hindukush | 1–1 | De Maiwand Atalan | AFF Stadium, Kabul |
| 15:30 AFT | Rizayee 84' | Report | Agha 59' (pen.) |

| 23 September 2014 | De Spinghar Bazan | 1–1 | Shaheen Asmayee | AFF Stadium, Kabul |
| 15:30 AFT | Himati 58' | Report | Barakzai 42' (pen.) |

| 25 September 2014 | De Maiwand Atalan | 1–1 (a.e.t.) (7–8 p) | Oqaban Hindukush | AFF Stadium, Kabul |
| 15:30 AFT | Hafiz 112' | Report | Totakhil 97' |

| 26 September 2014 | Shaheen Asmayee | 3–0 | De Spinghar Bazan | AFF Stadium, Kabul |
| 14:30 AFT | Hashimi 55'; Sharifi 90+1' | Report | Naseeri 79' (o.g.) |

=== Consolation ===
2 October 2014
14:30 AFT

| De Spinghar Bazan | 5–5 (a.e.t.) | De Maiwand Atalan |
|---|---|---|
| Naeemi 38', 110'; Hussainni 82', 88', 101' | Report | Nasiri 43'; Agha 56'; Irfan 76'; Yusufzai 114', 118' |
Penalties
| | 4–2 |

AFF Stadium, Kabul

=== Final ===
3 October 2014
14:30 AFT

| Shaheen Asmayee | 3–2 (a.e.t.) | Oqaban Hindukush |
|---|---|---|
| Sharifi 45+1'; Barakzai 92' | Report | Gariwal 30' (o.g.); Akbari 60'; Rizayee 69' |

AFF Stadium, Kabul

== Top scorers ==
As of 3 October 2014.

| Rank | Scorer | Club | Goals |
|---|---|---|---|
| 1 | (Afghanistan) M. Riza Rizayee | Oqaban Hindukush | 6 |
| 2 | (Afghanistan) Hashmatullah Barakzai | Shaheen Asmayee | 5 |
| 3 | (Afghanistan) Masoud Qarizada | Mawjhai Amu | 4 |
| 3 | (Afghanistan) Mustafa Afshar | Shaheen Asmayee | 4 |
| 3 | (Afghanistan) Anwar Akbari | Oqaban Hindukush | 4 |
| 3 | (Afghanistan) Sayed Naseer Hussaini | De Spinghar Bazan | 4 |
| 3 | (Afghanistan) Khalid Ahmad Irfan | De Maiwand Atalan | 4 |
| 3 | (Afghanistan) Amriddin Sharifi | Shaheen Asmayee | 4 |
