= 2017 Afghan Premier League =

Afghan Premier League
- Season: 2017
- Teams: 8
- Champions: Shaheen Asmayee
- Matches: 18
- Goals: 34 (1.89 per match)

The 2017 Afghan Premier League was the sixth season of Afghan Premier League, the Afghan league for association football clubs established in 2012. Shaheen Asmayee were the champions of the season.

== Teams ==
The following eight teams, which represent the country's eight main regions, will participate in the 2017 Afghan Premier League.

- De Abasin Sape
- De Maiwand Atalan
- De Spin Ghar Bazan
- Mawjhal Amu
- Oqaban Hindukush
- Shaheen Asmayee
- Simorgh Alborz
- Toofaan Harirod

== Group A ==
Pos	Team	Pld	W	D	L	GF	GA	GD	Pts	Qualification
1	Shaheen Asmayee	3	2	0	1	6	5	+1	6	Qualification to Semi finals
2	De Spin Ghar Bazan	3	2	0	1	5	4	+1	6	Qualification to Semi finals
3	Oqaban Hindukush	3	1	0	2	2	2	0	3	
4	Mawjhal Amu	3	1	0	2	1	3	−2	3	

Source: Soccerway

== Group B ==
Pos	Team	Pld	W	D	L	GF	GA	GD	Pts	Qualification
1	De Maiwand Atalan	3	2	1	0	11	6	+5	7	Qualification to Semi finals
2	Simorgh Alborz	3	1	2	0	3	2	+1	5	Qualification to Semi finals
3	Toofaan Harirod	3	1	1	1	9	5	+4	4	
4	De Abasin Sape	3	0	0	3	3	13	−10	0	

Source: Soccerway

== Semi finals ==
=== First leg ===
12 October 2017	Shaheen Asmayee	1–0	Simorgh Alborz	Afghanistan Football Federation Stadium

13 October 2017	De Maiwand Atalan	2–0	De Spin Ghar Bazan	Afghanistan Football Federation Stadium

=== Second leg ===
19 October 2017	De Spin Ghar Bazan	0–0	De Maiwand Atalan	Afghanistan Football Federation Stadium

20 October 2017	Simorgh Alborz	3–4	Shaheen Asmayee	Afghanistan Football Federation Stadium

== 3rd place final ==
26 October 2017

Simorgh Alborz	0–1	De Spin Ghar Bazan

Afghanistan Football Federation Stadium

== Final ==
27 October 2017

Shaheen Asmayee	4–3 (a.e.t.)	De Maiwand Atalan

Afghanistan Football Federation Stadium
