= 2018 Afghan Premier League =

Afghan Premier League
- Season: 2018
- Dates: 7 October – 25 October
- Champions: Toofaan Harirod (2nd title)
- Matches: 15
- Goals: 37 (2.47 per match)
- Best player: Yar Mohammad Zakarkhel (Toofaan Harirod)
- Top goalscorer: Yar Mohammad Zakarkhel
- Best goalkeeper: Shakib Haidari (2 clean sheets)
- Biggest home win: Toofaan Harirod 4–0 De Abasin Sape (23 October 2018)
- Biggest away win: De Maiwand Atalan 0–3 Toofaan Harirod (12 October 2018)
- Highest scoring: De Spin Ghar Bazan 2–3 De Abasin Sape (9 October 2018)
- Longest winning run: 5 games Toofaan Harirod
- Longest unbeaten run: 5 games Toofaan Harirod
- Longest winless run: 3 games De Spin Ghar Bazan; Mawjhai Amu; Oqaban Hindukush
- Longest losing run: 3 games Oqaban Hindukush
- All statistics correct as of 25 October 2019.

The 2018 Afghan Premier League is the seventh season of Afghan Premier League, the Afghan league for association football clubs established in 2012. The season was initially postponed due to lack of funding, but was revived after new sponsors were secured.

The season began on the 7th October, 2018. Shaheen Asmayee were the two-time defending champions and reached the final of the 2018 Afghan Premier League. Toofaan Harirod became the champions for the second time in their history by winning the final during extra time, 1–0.

== Teams ==
The following eight teams, which represent the country's eight main regions, participated in the 2018 Afghan Premier League.

- De Abasin Sape
- De Maiwand Atalan
- De Spin Ghar Bazan
- Mawjhal Amu
- Oqaban Hindukush
- Shaheen Asmayee
- Simorgh Alborz
- Toofaan Harirod

== Group stage ==
The draw for the group stage was held on 1 October 2018.

=== Group A ===
Pos	Team	Pld	W	D	L	GF	GA	GD	Pts	Qualification
1	Shaheen Asmayee	3	3	0	0	6	1	+5	9	Qualification to Semi finals
2	De Abasin Sape	3	1	1	1	4	4	0	4	Qualification to Semi finals
3	Mawjhal Amu	3	0	2	1	2	4	−2	2	
4	De Spin Ghar Bazan	3	0	1	2	4	7	−3	1	

Source: Soccerway APL

7 October 2018	Shaheen Asmayee	2–0	Mawjhal Amu	Afghanistan Football Federation Stadium
17:30

9 October 2018	De Spin Ghar Bazan	2–3	De Abasin Sape	Afghanistan Football Federation Stadium
17:30

11 October 2018	Shaheen Asmayee	1–0	De Abasin Sape	Afghanistan Football Federation Stadium
17:30

13 October 2018	De Spin Ghar Bazan	1–1	Mawjhal Amu	Afghanistan Football Federation Stadium
17:30

15 October 2018	Shaheen Asmayee	3–1	De Spin Ghar Bazan	Afghanistan Football Federation Stadium
17:30

17 October 2018	De Abasin Sape	1–1	Mawjhal Amu	Afghanistan Football Federation Stadium
17:30

=== Group B ===
Pos	Team	Pld	W	D	L	GF	GA	GD	Pts	Qualification
1	Toofaan Harirod	3	3	0	0	7	0	+7	9	Qualification to Semi finals
2	De Maiwand Atalan	3	2	0	1	4	3	+1	6	Qualification to Semi finals
3	Simorgh Alborz	3	1	0	2	3	4	−1	3	
4	Oqaban Hindukush	3	0	0	3	1	8	−7	0	

Source: Soccerway APL

8 October 2018	De Maiwand Atalan	2–0	Oqaban Hindukush	Afghanistan Football Federation Stadium
17:30

10 October 2018	Simorgh Alborz	0–1	Toofaan Harirod	Afghanistan Football Federation Stadium
17:30

12 October 2018	De Maiwand Atalan	0–3	Toofaan Harirod	Afghanistan Football Federation Stadium
17:30

14 October 2018	Simorgh Alborz	3–1	Oqaban Hindukush	Afghanistan Football Federation Stadium
17:30

16 October 2018	De Maiwand Atalan	2–0	Simorgh Alborz	Afghanistan Football Federation Stadium
17:30

18 October 2018	Toofaan Harirod	3–0	Oqaban Hindukush	Afghanistan Football Federation Stadium
17:30

== Semi finals ==
22 October 2018	Shaheen Asmayee	1–0	De Maiwand Atalan	Afghanistan Football Federation Stadium
17:30

23 October 2018	Toofaan Harirod	4–0	De Abasin Sape	Afghanistan Football Federation Stadium
17:30

== Final ==
25 October 2018
17:30

Shaheen Asmayee	0–1 (a.e.t.)	Toofaan Harirod

Afghanistan Football Federation Stadium
