= 2019 Afghan Premier League =

Afghan Premier League
- Season: 2019
- Champions: Toofan Harirod F.C.
- Cup: Toofan Harirod F.C.
- Matches: 15
- Goals: 43 (2.87 per match)
- Best Player: Faisal Hamidi (Toofan Harirod)
- Top goalscorer: Raoof Qaderi (Shaheen Asmayee)
- Best goalkeeper: Kawash Haidari (Shaheen Asmayee)
- All statistics correct as of October 19, 2019.

The 2019 Afghan Premier League was the eighth season of Afghan Premier League, the Afghan league for association football clubs, which was launched in 2012. The season commenced on 20 August 2019. Toofan Harirod F.C successfully defended their title by defeating Shaheen Asmayee F.C in the final, 1-0 a.e.t.

== Teams ==
The following eight teams, which represent the country's eight main regions, participate in the 2019 Afghan Premier League.

- De Abasin Sape
- De Maiwand Atalan
- De Spin Ghar Bazan
- Mawjhai Amu
- Oqaban Hindukush
- Shaheen Asmayee
- Simorgh Alborz
- Toofaan Harirod

== Group stage ==
The draw for the group stage was held on 15 August 2019.

=== Group A ===
Pos	Team	Pld	W	D	L	GF	GA	GD	Pts	Qualification
1	Toofaan Harirod	3	3	0	0	8	3	+5	9	Qualification for Knockout stage
2	Simorgh Alborz	3	2	0	1	5	1	+4	6	Qualification for Knockout stage
3	Mawjhai Amu	3	0	1	2	3	5	−2	1	
4	De Maiwand Atalan	3	0	1	2	2	9	−7	1	

Source: APL

=== Group B ===
Pos	Team	Pld	W	D	L	GF	GA	GD	Pts	Qualification
1	Shaheen Asmayee	3	3	0	0	6	1	+5	9	Qualification for Knockout stage
2	De Spin Ghar Bazan	3	2	0	1	7	3	+4	6	Qualification for Knockout stage
3	Oqaban Hindukush	3	1	0	2	4	4	0	3	
4	De Abasin Sape	3	0	0	3	2	11	−9	0	

Source: APL

== Knockout stage ==
Semi-finals
13 September
Shaheen Asmayee	5
Simorgh Alborz	0
12 September
Toofaan Harirod	2
De Spin Ghar Bazan	0

Final
20 September
Shaheen Asmayee	0
Toofaan Harirod (a.e.t.)	1
