= 2013 Afghan Premier League =

Afghan Premier League
- Season: 2013
- Champions: Shaheen Asmayee
- Matches: 17
- Goals: 58 (3.41 per match)
- Top goalscorer: Hamidullah Karimi; Hashmatullah Barakzai (7 goals each)

The 2013 Afghan Premier League season was the second sedition of Afghan Premier League, the Afghan league for association football clubs, since its establishment in 2012. The season began on 22 August 2013 with the group stage and ended at the final on 11 October 2013.

Toofaan Harirod unsuccessfully defended its 2012 title on 3 October 2013 in the Semi finals in AFF Stadium, Kabul losing to Shaheen Asmayee. 2 – 0.

Shaheen Asmayee F.C. successfully pursued their first Afghan Premier League title defeating Simorgh Alborz F.C., 3–1 (a.e.t.).

== Format ==
For a consecutive season of the Afghan Premier League, the Afghanistan Football Federation and Moby Group, the co-founders and the organizers of the league, decided to have the league start in three stages. To expand the league to the Provinces of Afghanistan the organizers decided to have stage one begin with regional tournaments which would eventually provide team selection for the eight Afghan Premier League teams. In total there will be eight different regional tournaments in May and June 2013 with each tournament featuring around four to six teams. Along with the Afghan-based regional teams there will also be one team on Afghan refugees from Iran and one team of Afghan refugees from Pakistan entering the regional round in the Center and East tournaments respectively.

The idea of the regional tournaments is to allow younger players a chance at becoming a professional footballer. At the end of the regional tournaments the best 26 players from the participating teams in each region will be selected to the Afghan Premier League team that is based in that specific region.

Finally in order to select the final 18-man squad for the official Afghan Premier League season, a special televised tournament during the holy month of ramadan called Maidan-e-Sabz will air in which judges, coaches, and even the voting fans will decide who will be the final 18 players for each team. Before this stage begins, at the beginning of Ramadan, the coaches and trainers from each team will select the best 15 players out of 26 players in which during the holy month the best 15 players will play against the remaining non-selected 11 players in intra-squad matches. At the end of each week's show the television audience will be asked to send in their votes for their top player in each position and those results will be taken into consideration by the judges. The judges for this show will be certified coaches from the Afghanistan Football Federation; they will decide their top 3 players from the 11 players for each team.

Finally, the second edition of the Afghan Premier League will officially kick-off on 22 August 2013 at the Afghanistan Football Federation Stadium with the group stage going on till 27 September 2013. The semi-finals will be played in a two-legged format in October with the Final taking place on 11 October 2013.

== Teams ==
A total of 8 teams will contest the league. All 8 teams are spread out across Afghanistan, but all the matches would be played at the Afghanistan Football Federation stadium in Kabul. The eight teams were divided into 2 groups of 4 in the 18 game total league which will conclude on 19 October 2012 with the Grand Final.

== Final standings ==
1) Toofaan Harirod F.C.

2) Oqaban Hindukush F.C.

3) Shaheen Asmayee F.C.

4) Simorgh Alborz F.C.

5) De Abasin Sape F.C.

6) De Spin Ghar Bazan F.C.

7) Mawjhai Amu F.C.

8) De Maiwand Atalan F.C.

=== Teams and locations ===
Team	Region	Group
De Spin Ghar Bazan	East	Group A
Mawjhai Amu	Northeast	Group A
Simorgh Alborz	Northwest	Group A
Toofan Harirod	West	Group A
De Abasin Sape	Southeast	Group B
De Maiwand Atalan	South	Group B
Oqaban Hindukush	Center	Group B
Shaheen Asmayee	Kabul	Group B

== Group stage ==
=== Group A ===
Team	Pld	W	D	L	GF	GA	GD	Pts	Qualification
Toofaan Harirod	3	2	1	0	11	3	+8	7	Semi-Finals
Simorgh Alborz	3	1	2	0	10	5	+5	5	Semi-Finals
De Spin Ghar Bazan	3	1	0	2	2	11	–9	3	
Mawjhai Amu	3	0	2	1	3	7	-4	1	

22 August 2013	Toofaan Harirod	5 – 0	De Spin Ghar Bazan	AFF Stadium, Kabul
16:00 AFT	Nadeem 7' (pen.); Azadani 17'; Afshar 27'; Mohammadi 70'; Yaqoobi	Report

29 August 2013	Simorgh Alborz	2 – 2	Mawjhai Amu	AFF Stadium, Kabul
16:00 AFT		Report

5 September 2013	Simorgh Alborz	5 – 0	De Spin Ghar Bazan	AFF Stadium, Kabul
16:00 AFT

13 September 2013	Toofaan Harirod	3 – 0	Mawjhai Amu	AFF Stadium, Kabul
16:00 AFT

19 September 2013	Toofaan Harirod	3 – 3	Simorgh Alborz	AFF Stadium, Kabul
16:00 AFT

26 September 2013	Mawjhai Amu	1 – 2	De Spin Ghar Bazan	AFF Stadium, Kabul
16:00 AFT

=== Group B ===
Team	Pld	W	D	L	GF	GA	GD	Pts	Qualification
Oqaban Hindukush	3	2	1	0	8	2	+6	7	Semi-Finals
Shaheen Asmayee	3	2	1	0	4	1	+3	7	Semi-Finals
De Abasin Sape	3	1	0	2	3	6	-3	3	
De Maiwand Atalan	3	0	0	3	1	6	–5	0	

23 August 2013	Shaheen Asmayee	1 – 1	Oqaban Hindukush	AFF Stadium, Kabul
16:00 AFT	Sharifi 40'; Barakzai 53', 90'	Report	Totakhil 88'

30 August 2013	De Maiwand Atalan	0 – 2	De Abasin Sape	AFF Stadium, Kabul
16:00 AFT

6 September 2013	De Maiwand Atalan	1 – 2	Oqaban Hindukush	AFF Stadium, Kabul
16:00 AFT

12 September 2013	De Abasin Sape	1 – 5	Oqaban Hindukush	AFF Stadium, Kabul
16:00 AFT

20 September 2013	Shaheen Asmayee	2 – 0	De Maiwand Atalan	AFF Stadium, Kabul
16:00 AFT

27 September 2013	Shaheen Asmayee	1 – 0	De Abasin Sape	AFF Stadium, Kabul
16:00 AFT

== Knockout stage ==
Semifinals
1	Toofaan Harirod	2	0	2
4	Shaheen Asmayee	0	3	3
3	Oqaban Hindukush	2	1	3
2	Simorgh Alborz	1	3	4

Finals
Shaheen Asmayee	3
Simorgh Alborz	1

=== Semi-finals ===
3 October 2013	Toofaan Harirod	2 – 0	Shaheen Asmayee	AFF Stadium, Kabul

4 October 2013	Oqaban Hindukush	2 – 1	Simorgh Alborz	AFF Stadium, Kabul

6 October 2013	Toofaan Harirod	0 – 3	Shaheen Asmayee	AFF Stadium, Kabul

7 October 2013	Oqaban Hindukush	1 – 3	Simorgh Alborz	AFF Stadium, Kabul

=== Final ===
11 October 2013

Shaheen Asmayee	3 – 1 (a.e.t.)	Simorgh Alborz

AFF Stadium, Kabul

== Goalscorers ==
7 goals:

- Hamidullah Karimi (Toofaan Harirod)
- Hashmatullah Barakzai (Shaheen Asmayee)

6 goals:

- Fayaz Azizi (Simorgh Alborz)

3 goals:

- Maroof Mohammadi (Toofaan Harirod)
- Ghulam Yaqoobi (Toofaan Harirod)
- Munirulhaq Nadim (Simorgh Alborz)
- Zamarai Salangi (Oqaban Hindukush)

2 goals:

- Rafi Barakzai (Toofaan Harirod)
- Hashmatullah Ghaznawi (De Abasin Sape)
- Anwar (Oqaban Hindukush)
- Omeed Nasib (Simorgh Alborz)

== Awards ==
Champion: (Shaheen Asmayee)

Golden Boot:

- (Afghanistan) Hamidullah Karimi (Toofaan Harirod)
- (Afghanistan) Hashmatullah Barakzai (Shaheen Asmayee)

Player of the Season:

- (Afghanistan) Hashmatullah Barakzai (Shaheen Asmayee)
