= Anwar Akbari =

Afghan footballer (born 1990)

Personal information
- Full name: Mohammad Anwar Akbari
- Date of birth: 2 August 1990 (age 36)
- Place of birth: Helmand, Afghanistan
- Height: 1.72 m (5 ft 8 in)
- Position: Midfielder

Team information
- Current team: Shaheen Asmayee

Senior career*
Years	Team	Apps	(Gls)
2011–2012	Ordu Kabul F.C.		
2013–2015	Oqaban Hindukush F.C.	14	(6)
2016	FC Sorkh Poshan		
2016	Toofan Harirod F.C.	3	(1)
2017–	Shaheen Asmayee		

International career^{‡}
2015	Afghanistan U-23	4	(0)
2015–2016	Afghanistan	5	(0)
- * Club domestic league appearances and goals as of 21 September 2023 ‡ National team caps and goals as of 21 September 2023

Mohammad Anwar Akbari (born 2 August 1990) is an Afghan footballer who plays for Shaheen Asmayee in the Afghan Premier League.
