= Mohammad Rafi Barekzay =

Afghan footballer

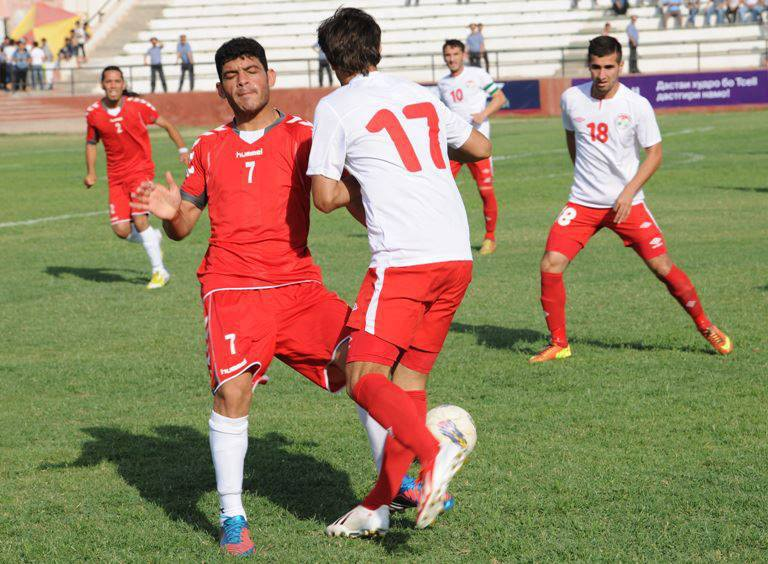
- Barekzay (number 7) playing for Afghanistan in 2014

Personal information
- Full name: Mohammad Rafi Barekzay
- Date of birth: 6 June 1990 (age 36)
- Place of birth: Herat, Afghanistan
- Height: 1.78 m (5 ft 10 in)
- Position: Midfielder

Team information
- Current team: Toofaan Harirod F.C.
- Number: 7

Senior career*
Years	Team	Apps	(Gls)
2010–2011	Abumoslem Herat		
2011–2012	Ansari Herat FC		
2012–	Toofan Harirod F.C.		

International career^{‡}
2013–	Afghanistan	8	(1)
Medal record
Men's football
Representing Afghanistan
SAFF Championship
Winner	2013 Nepal
- * Club domestic league appearances and goals as of June 07, 2014 ‡ National team caps and goals as of June 07, 2014

Mohammad Rafi Barekzay (born 6 June 1990) is an Afghan footballer who plays as a midfielder for Toofaan Harirod F.C. in the Afghan Premier League. Barekzay has also played for the Afghanistan national team.

== Career ==
=== Toofaan Harirod F.C. ===
In 2012, Barekzay joined Afghan team Toofaan Harirod F.C. where he wore the number 7 shirt and played as a midfielder. He won the Afghan Premier League with Toofan Harirod in 2012.

== Champions ==
Toofaan Harirod F.C. won the first season and earned $15,000, defeating Simorgh Alborz F.C. 2–1 in the final match of the tournament, the first season of the league in the country. They also outplayed De Spin Ghar Bazan F.C. by a margin of 10–0 to advance to the Final. This gave them the confidence towards their success in the final. Large numbers of supporters of both teams and officials from the government, came together in the stadium to watch the final match. Those who came, included: Dr. Abdullah Abdullah, the Governing body of Afghanistan Football Federation and others.

== International career ==
He made his international debut for Afghanistan in a friendly match against Tajikistan in 2013. Since 2014, he has played eight games and scored one goal.

== Honours ==
Toofan Harirod FC

- Afghan Premier League: 2012

Afghanistan

- SAFF Championship: 2013
