= Fardin Hakimi =

Afghan footballer

Personal information
- Full name: Fardin Hakimi
- Date of birth: January 15, 1995 (age 31)
- Place of birth: Bazarak, Afghanistan
- Height: 1.75 m (5 ft 9 in)
- Position: Central attacking midfielder

Team information
- Current team: Arambagh KS

Youth career
- Panjshir Youth F.C.

Senior career*
Years	Team	Apps	(Gls)
2012–2014	Oqaban Hindukush F.C.		
2015	Shaheen Asmayee F.C.	5	(1)
2016–2020	Toofaan Harirod F.C.		
2020–	Arambagh KS		

International career
2015–2016	Afghanistan	7	(0)
- * Club domestic league appearances and goals

Fardin Hakimi (Dari: فردین حکیمی; born 15 January 1995) is an Afghan footballer who plays as an attacking midfielder for Bangladeshi club Arambagh KS and the Afghanistan national team.

== Career ==
With Oqaban Hindukush F.C., he secured the league runners-up trophy in Afghanistan in 2014 before leaving the club at the end of the year. Fardin has earned approbation for his performances in the Afghan Premier League, getting called up to the national team for the 2015 SAFF Championship, making two appearances.

Fardin has represented Afghanistan at numerous and multiple levels composed of the U-17, U-19, and U-23 teams respectively.
