= Hamidullah Karimi =

Afghan footballer

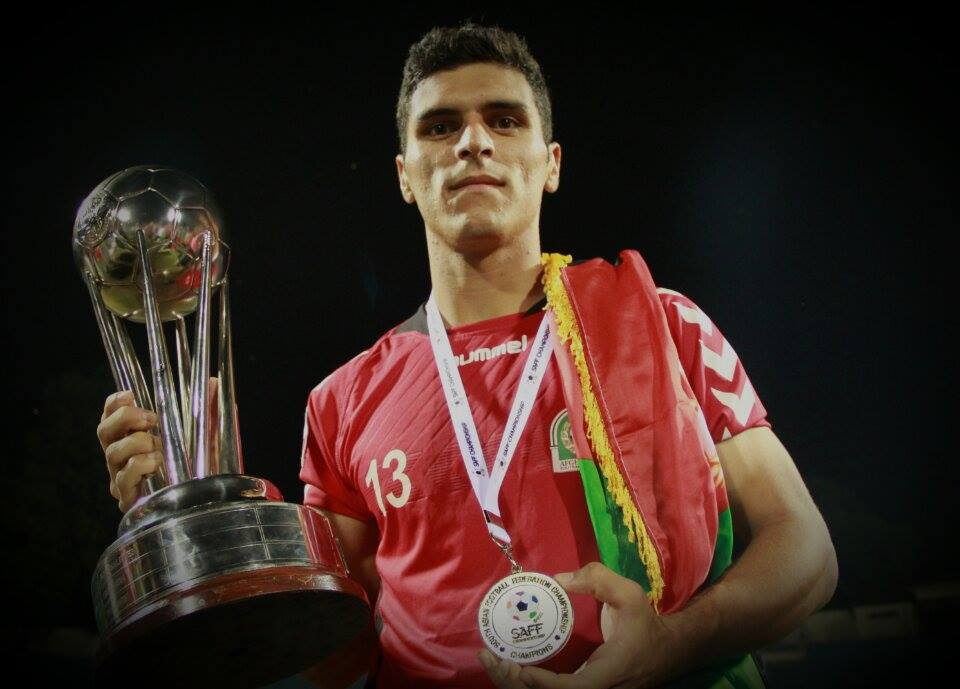
- Karimi holding the trophy with Afghanistan at the 2013 SAFF Championship

Personal information
- Full name: Hamidullah Karimi
- Date of birth: 6 February 1992 (age 34)
- Place of birth: Herat, Afghanistan
- Height: 1.79 m (5 ft 10 1/2 in)
- Position: Forward

Team information
- Current team: Delhi United S.C.
- Number: 9

Senior career*
Years	Team	Apps	(Gls)
2012	Ettefaq Herat		
2012–	Toofan Harirod F.C.	11	(16)
2013	→ Kohistan Herat (loan)	13	(6)
2014–2015	Meghe United	0	(0)
2015–2017	Sorkhposhan Herat	0	(0)
2017–	→ Delhi United S.C. (loan)	4	(0)

International career^{‡}
2013–	Afghanistan	2	(1)
Medal record
Men's football
Representing Afghanistan
SAFF Championship
Winner	2013 Nepal
- * Club domestic league appearances and goals as of June 07, 2014 ‡ National team caps and goals as of June 07, 2014

Hamidullah Karimi (born 6 February 1992) is an Afghan footballer who currently plays as a forward for Indian club Delhi United S.C. He has been capped for the Afghanistan national football team.

== Club career ==
Karimi joined Toofan Harirod F.C. in 2012. In the 2012 Afghan Premier League, he scored 9 goals in 5 games and was the league's top scorer, helping Toofan Harirod F.C. win the inaugural Afghan Premier League. In the 2013 Afghan Premier League, Toofan Harirod F.C. were eliminated by Shaheen Asmayee F.C. in the semi-finals. In Toofan Harirod F.C.'s final game of the season against Oqaban Hindukush F.C., Karimi scored 2 goals to help his team win third place of the 2013 Afghan Premier League. He later went on to play for Meghe United in India, Sorkhposhan Herat and Delhi United.

== International career ==
Karimi was called up for Afghanistan's squad in the 2014 AFC Challenge Cup Qualifiers but did not play in a single game. In the 2013 SAFF Championship, he was subbed in for Belal Arezou versus Maldives and had one chance that was saved after receiving a pass from Toofan Harirod teammate Maroof Mohammadi.

== International goals ==
No.	Date	Venue	Opponent	Score	Result	Competition
1.	4 June 2013	National Football Stadium, Malé, Maldives	Maldives	1–0	1–1 (a.e.t.) (7–9 p)	2014 AFC Challenge Cup

== Honours ==
Toofan Harirod F.C.

- 2012 Afghan Premier League

Afghanistan

- 2013 SAFF Championship

Individual

- 2012 Afghan Premier League Golden Boot
- 2013 Afghan Premier League Golden Boot
