= Tharindu =

Tharindu is a Sinhalese first name with its literal meaning being "Moon ".

- Tharindu Eranga, Sri Lankan footballer
- Tharindu Fernando, Italian cricketer
- Tharindu Kaushal, Sri Lankan cricketer
- Tharindu Wimaladasa, Sri Lankan cricketer
