= Fardeen =

Fardeen or Fardin is a masculine given name of Persian origin, meaning “radiant” and “one who has triple strength”. It is also an alternate name of the Solar Hijri month Farvardin. Notable people with the name include:

== Given name ==
=== Fardeen ===
- Fardeen Khan (born 1974), Indian actor
- Fardeen Hasan Ony (born 1997), Bangladeshi cricketer

=== Fardin ===
- Fardin Abedini (born 1991), Iranian footballer
- Fardin Hakimi (born 1995), Afghan footballer
- Fardin Hedayati (born 2004), Iranian wrestler
- Fardin Masoumi (born 1977), Iranian wrestler
- Fardin Rabet (born 2001), Iranian footballer
