= Dasun =

Dasun is a given name. Notable people with the name include:

- Dasun Paranavithana, Sri Lankan footballer
- Dasun Pathirana (born 1985), Sri Lankan model and actor
- Dasun Senevirathna (born 1998), Sri Lankan cricketer
- Dasun Shanaka (born 1991), Sri Lankan cricketer
