= Mohammad Marouf Jamhour =

Afghan footballer

Personal information
- Full name: Mohammad Marouf Jamhour Mohammadi
- Date of birth: 2 July 1993 (age 33)
- Place of birth: Kabul, Afghanistan
- Height: 1.73 m (5 ft 8 in)
- Position: Left midfielder

Team information
- Current team: Toofaan Harirod F.C.
- Number: 17

Senior career*
Years	Team	Apps	(Gls)
2012–	Toofaan Harirod F.C.	24	(3)

International career
2013–	Afghanistan	6	(1)
Medal record
Men's football
Representing Afghanistan
SAFF Championship
Winner	2013 Nepal
- * Club domestic league appearances and goals

Mohammad Marouf Jamhour Mohammadi (born 2 July 1993) is an Afghan footballer who currently plays for Toofaan Harirod F.C., and the Afghanistan national football team. He wears number 17 shirt and plays as a midfielder.

== International career ==
Mohammadi played his first match against Pakistan, where he scored the last goal in a 3–0 win. It was the first time in more than 36 years that an international football match was held in Afghanistan.

In the 2013 SAFF Championship Mohammadi played 4 games as Afghanistan won its first ever title, playing in the final win against India.

=== International goals ===
Scores and results list Afghanistan's goal tally first.

No.	Date	Venue	Opponent	Score	Result	Competition
1	20 August 2013	Ghazi Stadium, Kabul, Afghanistan	Pakistan	3–0	3–0	Friendly

== Club career ==
Mohammadi is a member of Toofaan Harirod F.C. On 19 October 2012 Mohammadi scored the first goal, just minutes into the match in a 2–1 win over Simorgh Alborz F.C. for Toofan to win the 2012 Afghan Premier League. Mohammadi also won the title of being the best player of the match, and the prize of 50,000 Afs attached to it.

== Honours ==
Afghanistan

- SAFF Championship: 2013
