= Rahmatullah Khairkhah =

Afghan footballer

Personal information
- Date of birth: 21 February 1996 (age 30)
- Place of birth: Herat, Afghanistan
- Height: 1.80 m (5 ft 11 in)
- Position: Midfielder

Team information
- Current team: Toofan Harirod
- Number: 20

Senior career*
| Years | Team | Apps | (Gls) |
| 2015– | Toofan Harirod | | |

International career^{‡}
| 2017 | Afghanistan U23 | 2 | (0) |
| 2019– | Afghanistan | 1 | (0) |
- * Club domestic league appearances and goals ‡ National team caps and goals as of 10 October 2019

Rahmatullah Khairkhah (born 21 February 1996) is an Afghan footballer who plays as a midfielder for Afghan club Toofan Harirod and the Afghanistan national team.

== International career ==
Khairkhah made his debut for Afghanistan on 10 October 2019, in a 2022 FIFA World Cup qualifier match against Oman; he came on as an 80th-minute substitute in a 3–0 defeat.
