= Mujtaba Faiz =

Afghan footballer (born 1982)

Personal information
- Date of birth: 7 March 1982 (age 44)
- Place of birth: Kabul, Afghanistan
- Position: Defender

Team information
- Current team: Shaheen Asmayee
- Number: 4

Senior career*
Years	Team	Apps	(Gls)
2010–2012	Feruzi F.C.		
2012	Shaheen Asmayee	3	(1)
2012–2013	Air India	0	(0)
2013	→Big Bear (loan)		
2013–	Shaheen Asmayee	9	(1)

International career^{‡}
2010–	Afghanistan	8	(0)
Medal record
Men's football
Representing Afghanistan
SAFF Championship
Winner	2013 Nepal
- * Club domestic league appearances and goals as of 7 June 2014 ‡ National team caps and goals as of 7 June 2014

Mujtaba Faiz (Persian: مجتبى فيض; born 7 November 1982 in Kabul) is an Afghan professional footballer who plays as a defender for Shaheen Asmayee in the Afghan Premier League.

== Club career ==
Faiz plays for Shaheen Asmayee. He mostly plays as rightback but also can play central defender.

== International career ==
He was selected for the 2014 AFC Challenge Cup in Maldives where he played as a defender with number 21.

== Honours ==
Shaheen Asmayee F.C.

- Afghan Premier League: 2
  - 2013
  - 2014

Afghanistan

- SAFF Championship: 2013
