= Muqadar Qazizadah =

Afghan footballer

Personal information
- Full name: Muqadar Faizullah Qazizadah
- Date of birth: 11 September 1988 (age 38)
- Place of birth: Afghanistan
- Position: Defender

Team information
- Current team: Shaheen Asmayee F.C.
- Number: 2

Senior career*
Years	Team	Apps	(Gls)
2012–	Shaheen Asmayee F.C.	15	(0)

International career^{‡}
2008–	Afghanistan	16	(0)
Medal record
Men's football
Representing Afghanistan
SAFF Championship
Winner	2013 Nepal
- * Club domestic league appearances and goals as of Oct 5, 2014 ‡ National team caps and goals as of June 07, 2014

Muqadar Qazizadah (born 11 September 1988) is an Afghan footballer who plays for Shaheen Asmayee F.C. and the Afghanistan national team. Until 2011, Qazizadh played for Kabul Bank F.C. football club. He wears number 2 and plays as a right back.

== Honours ==
Shaheen Asmayee F.C.

- Afghan Premier League: 2
  - 2013
  - 2014

Afghanistan

- 2013 SAFF Championship
