= Kohistan Herat =

Afghan football club

Kohistan
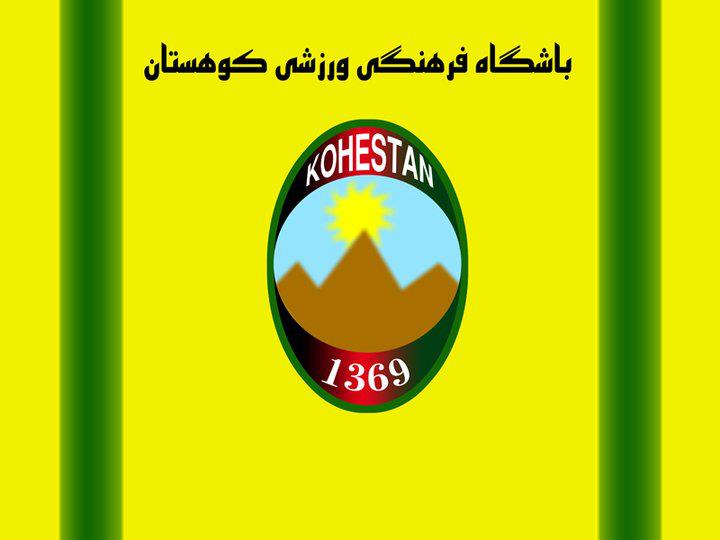
- Full name: Kohistan Football Club Herat
- Nicknames: Talahi Poshane Kohistan (The Yellow Submarine)
- Short name: KFC
- Founded: 25 January 1990; 36 years ago
- Ground: Herat Stadium; Herat
- Capacity: 15,000
- League: Herat Premier League
Home colours	Away colours

Kohistan Football Club Herat (Dari: باشگاه فوتبال کوهستان هرات) is a football club based in Herat, Afghanistan. The team also has a futsal section. They play in the Herat Premier League.

== History ==
The Kohistan Football Club Herat was founded on 25 January 1990; 36 years ago in Herat, a city in western Afghanistan. The club was owned and managed by Hamid Sultani, a former member of the Herat provincial football selection and coach who developed players in Afghanistan's western region. Sultani was killed in an armed attack in Herat in October 2021. The club subsequently appeared in local competition under the name Kohistan Shahid Sultani.

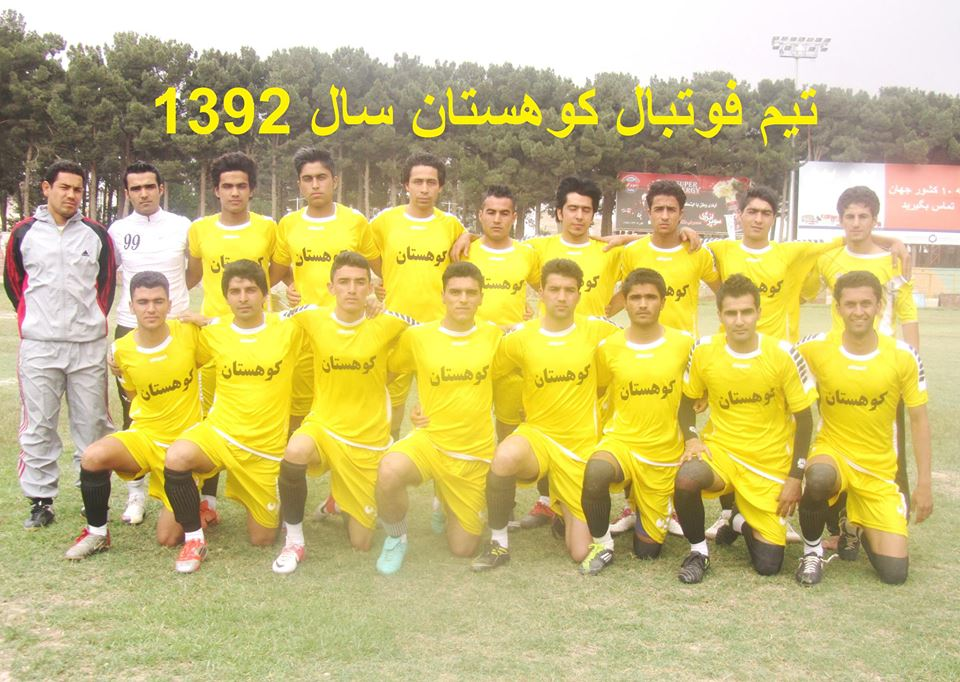
Kohistan in 2013

Afghanistan international Hamidullah Karimi developed at Kohistan before representing Toofan Harirod. He later played for Kohistan in the 2013 Herat Premier League. In January 2022, Kohistan reached the semi-finals of the Herat Provincial Cup.
