= Diwash Subba =

Bhutanese footballer

Personal information
- Full name: Diwash Subba
- Date of birth: 9 March 1989 (age 37)
- Place of birth: Dewathang, Bhutan
- Height: 1.67 m (5 ft 5 1/2 in)
- Position: Forward

Senior career*
Years	Team	Apps	(Gls)
2012–2016	Yeedzin		

International career
2012–2019	Bhutan		
- * Club domestic league appearances and goals

Diwash Subba is a Bhutanese professional footballer. He made his first appearance for the Bhutan national football team in 2012.
