= Hamidullah Yousafzai =

Afghan footballer

Hamid Yousafzai
Personal information
- Full name: Hamidullah Yousafzai
- Date of birth: 2 December 1981 (age 44)
- Place of birth: Kunduz, Democratic Republic of Afghanistan
- Height: 1.82 m (5 ft 11 1/2 in)
- Position: Goalkeeper

Team information
- Current team: Afghanistan (goalkeeping coach)

Senior career*
Years	Team	Apps	(Gls)
2013	Shaheen Asmayee	11	(0)

International career
2005–2015	Afghanistan	14	(0)

Managerial career
- 2023–: Afghanistan (goalkeeping coach)
Medal record
Men's football
Representing Afghanistan
SAFF Championship
Winner	2013 Nepal
- * Club domestic league appearances and goals

Hamidullah Yousafzai (Pashto: حمیدالله یوسفزی; born 2 December 1981) is an Afghan former professional football goalkeeper who played for the Afghanistan national football team, and has 14 caps. He is currently goalkeeping coach for Afghanistan.

== National team ==
He made his debut for the national team in SAFF Cup 2009, held in Bangladesh, where he played all three matches. His next 2 caps were against Tajikistan, in November 2010. He was goalkeeper on SAFF 2011.

== Honours ==
Afghanistan

- SAFF Championship: 2013
