= Tharindu Eranga =

Sri Lankan international footballer

Personal information
- Date of birth: 30 May 1991 (age 35)
- Place of birth: Sri Lanka
- Position: Midfielder

Team information
- Current team: Ratnam

Senior career*
Years	Team	Apps	(Gls)
2011–	Ratnam		

International career^{‡}
2013–	Sri Lanka	11	(5)
- * Club domestic league appearances and goals ‡ National team caps and goals as of 30 May 2017

Tharindu Eranga is a Sri Lankan international footballer who plays as a midfielder for Ratnam in the Sri Lanka Football Premier League.
