= Dasun Paranavithana =

Sri Lankan footballer

Personal information
- Date of birth: 10 January 1991 (age 35)
- Place of birth: Gampola, Sri Lanka
- Position: Goalkeeper

Team information
- Current team: Air Force

Senior career*
Years	Team	Apps	(Gls)
2009–	Air Force		

International career^{‡}
2013–	Sri Lanka	2	(0)
- * Club domestic league appearances and goals ‡ National team caps and goals as of 26 July 2013

Dasun Paranavithana is a Sri Lankan international footballer who plays as a goalkeeper for Air Force in the Sri Lanka Football Premier League.
