= Afghanistan International Bank =

Local commercial bank in Afghanistan

- Type: Private
- Founded: 2004
- Headquarters: Airport Road, BiBi Mahro , Kabul, Afghanistan
- Key people: Stewart Lockie (CEO)
- Website: www.aib.af

Afghanistan International Bank (AIB) is the largest private bank in Afghanistan with its head office in Kabul. It was founded in March 2004 and was the first bank to operate automated teller machine (ATM) and international debit card services in Afghanistan. It was originally founded by a consortium of four equal shareholders including Horizon Associates, Wilton Holdings, Asian Development Bank (ADB) and Afghan Investment Partners Corporation. Now, it is majority owned by Horizon Associates and Wilton Holdings with minority shareholder ownership by International Finance Corporation (IFC).

The bank operates 37 branch offices across Afghanistan, including Herat, Jalalabad, Kandahar, and Mazar-e-Sharif. AIB focuses its business on commercial lending to corporate and small and medium-sized enterprises (SMEs).

== Ownership history ==
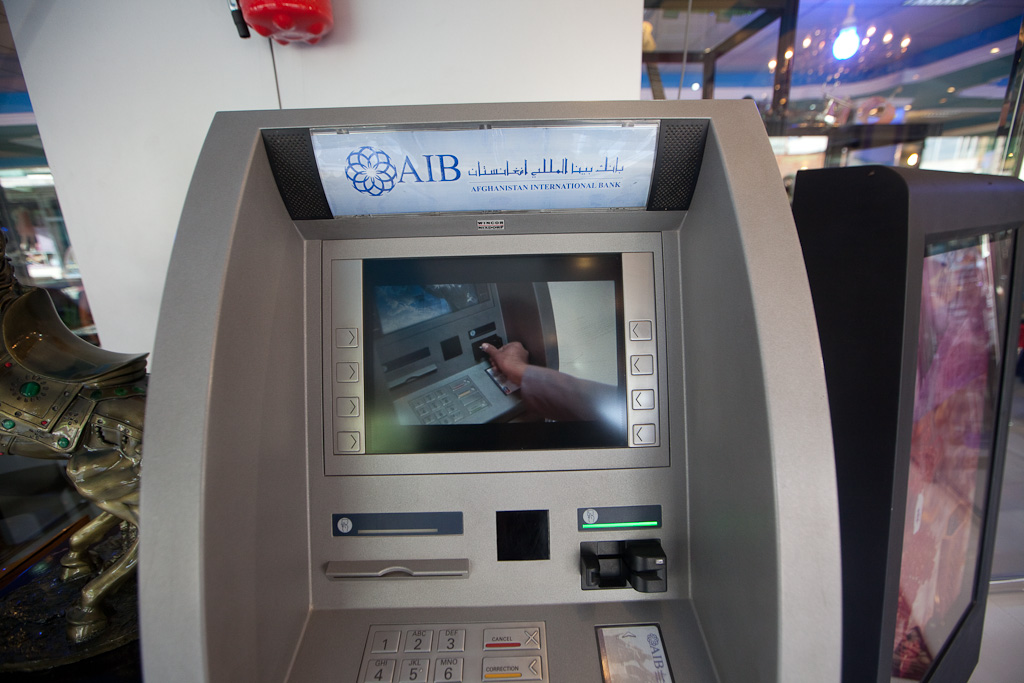
An ATM of Afghanistan International Bank in Kabul

The bank was founded in March 2004. It was the first bank to operate ATM services and international debit card services in Afghanistan. At first, the bank was owned by Asian Development Bank (ADB) Afghan Investment Partners Corporation, Horizon Associates and Wilton Holdings. Each of the four owners held same amount ownership which is 25% shareholder ownership.The ownerhip of the shareholder by ADB was acquired on 13 May 2004 in exchange for $2.6 million equity investment.

In December 2014, it was owned with a 46.25% shareholder ownership with the same amount by Horizon Associates and Wilton Holdings, followed by 7.5% owned by the ADB. Then in January 2016, ADB divested its ownership and received US$11.2 million from dividends and put option. On the same year, International Finance Corporation (IFC) proposed investment up to US$10 million for a 15% equity stake in AIB in two tranches.In 2026, it was owned with a 46.25% shareholder ownership with the same amount by Horizon Associates and Wilton Holdings, followed by 7.5% owned by the IFC.

== Operational ==
Afghanistan International Bank is the largest private bank by asset with approximately $950 million and got revenue growth of 13% to about $35.5 million in 2026.The bank has thirty seven branch officeswith headquarters in Bibi Mahro, Kabul and spread in Herat, Jalalabad, Kandahar, and Mazar-e-Sharif. Afghanistan International Bank holds $790 million in deposits — about 20% of Afghanistan's deposit base. The Wall Street Journal has described the company as "one of the country's biggest lenders".

In 2012, AIB acquired Standard Chartered Bank in Afghanistan. In 2014, AIB focused its business in lending to corporate and small and medium-sized enterprises (SME) in trading sector (55 percent), followed by fuel suppliers (25.9 percent), construction (8.4 percent) and telecommunications (2.7 percent).Then in 2018, AIB focused its business in lending to the corporate and SME, mostly in construction (31 percent) and fuel supply (31 percent).
