= Hashmatullah Barakzai =

Afghan footballer

Personal information
- Full name: Hashmatullah Barakzai
- Date of birth: 26 August 1987 (age 39)
- Place of birth: Kabul, Afghanistan
- Position: Forward

Team information
- Current team: Shaheen Asmayee F.C.
- Number: 10

Senior career*
Years	Team	Apps	(Gls)
2004–2012	Kabul Bank FC	156	(178)
2013–2014	→Mumbai F.C. (loan)	1	(1)
2013–	Shaheen Asmayee F.C.	24	(18)

International career^{‡}
2007–present	Afghanistan	30	(5)
Medal record
Men's football
Representing Afghanistan
SAFF Championship
Winner	2013 Nepal
- * Club domestic league appearances and goals as of October 03, 2016 ‡ National team caps and goals as of June 07, 2014

Hashmatullah Barakzai (Pashto: حشمت الله بارکزی, born 26 August 1987) is an Afghan footballer who plays as a forward for Shaheen Asmayee F.C. in the Afghan Premier League. He has also played for the Afghanistan national team, scoring five goals.

== International goals ==
Date	Venue	Opponent	Result	Competition	Goals
2008-10-17	Kuala Lumpur, Malaysia	Nepal	2–2	2008 Merdeka Tournament	1
2009-12-07	Halchowk Stadium, Kathmandu, Nepal	Maldives	3–1	2009 SAFF Championship	1

== Achievements ==
Top Scorer of Kabul Premier League: 2007, 2008.

Top scorer of Afghan Premier League with 7 Goals in 6 caps for Shaheen Asmayee F.C. and best player of the tournament in 2013/14 season.

== Honours ==
Afghanistan

- SAFF Championship: 2013
