= Afghanistan Football Federation Stadium =

Football stadium in Kabul

Coordinates: 34°31′15″N 69°11′50″E

- AFF Stadium
- Interactive map of Afghanistan Football Federation Stadium
- Location: Kabul, Afghanistan
- Capacity: 6,000
- Surface: Artificial turf

Construction
- Opened: 18 September 2012; 13 years ago

Tenant
- Afghanistan Champions League (selected matches)

The Afghanistan Football Federation Stadium, also known as AFF Stadium, is a football stadium located southeast of the Shahr-e Naw neighborhood in Kabul, Afghanistan, next to the Afghanistan National Olympic Committee.

The AFF Stadium was a competition venue for some clubs of the defunct Afghan Premier League, and currently the Afghanistan Champions League. It can accommodate around 6,000 spectators. The surface of the stadium is artificial turf.

== See also ==
- Ghazi Stadium
- Football in Afghanistan
- Kabul International Cricket Stadium
