= Shaheen Asmayee FC =

Afghan football club

Shaheen Asmayee
- Full name: Shaheen Asmayee Football Club
- Nickname: Asmayee Falcons
- Founded: August 2012; 14 years ago
- Ground: Ghazi Stadium, Kabul
- Capacity: 25,000
- League: Afghan Premier League
Home colours	Away colours

Shaheen Asmayee (Urdu: شاهین آسمایی) or the Asmayee Falcons is a football club from Afghanistan. It last played in the Afghan Premier League, representing greater Kabul.

The club has won a record 5 Afghan Premier League titles. They are the only team to have won consecutive titles, having achieved that twice. In 2017, they became the first Afghan club to compete in the AFC Cup.

== History ==
The club was founded in August 2012, coinciding with the creation of the Afghan Premier League and its players were chosen through a reality television show called Maidan-E-Sabz (Green Field). Each Premier League team represents a particular region of Afghanistan. Shaheen Asmayee represents the capital city, Kabul. The club is named after Asmayi Mountain near Kabul.

In 2013, the second season of the Afghan Premier League, Shaheen Asmayee F.C won the League, defeating Simorgh Alborz F.C 3–1 in extra time. All the players received medals for their finals achievements with strong supporting crowds in Kabul.

In 2014, Shaheen Asmayee reached the final and defeated 3–2 Oqaban Hindukush F.C. In 2015, they were runners-up finalists to De Spin Ghar Bazan F.C.

In 2016–2017, they twice defeated in the final De Maiwand Atalan F.C. In 2018 and 2019, they lost in the final to Toofan Harirod F.C. In 2020, Shaheen Asmayee F.C won the League, defeating Simorgh Alborz F.C. 1–0.

They are the only team to have won back-to-back titles and have having achieved it twice. They have become champions in the Roshan Afghan Premier League five times, a record most titles.

== Competitive record ==
=== Continental History ===
Season	Competition	Round	Club	Home	Away	Aggregate
2017	AFC Cup	Preliminary Round	(Tajikistan) Khosilot	0–1	0–0	0–1

Season	Competition	Round
2017	Sheikh Kamal International Club Cup	Group Stage

== Honours ==
=== National ===
- Afghan Premier League
  - Champions (6): 2013, 2014, 2016, 2017, 2020, 2021
  - Runners-up (3): 2015, 2018, 2019
