= Afghan Premier League =

- Founded: 2012; 14 years ago
- Folded: 2020; 6 years ago
- Replaced by: Afghanistan Champions League
- Country: Afghanistan
- Confederation: AFC
- Number of clubs: 8
- Level on pyramid: 1
- International cup: AFC Cup
- Last champions: Shaheen Asmayee (5th title)
- Most championships: Shaheen Asmayee (5 titles)
- Broadcasters: TOLO; Lemar; Eleven Sports
- Website: afghanpremierleague.com

The Afghan Premier League, also known as Roshan Afghan Premier League for sponsorship reasons, was a professional men's football league run by the Afghanistan Football Federation (AFF).

The league was contested by eight teams. The competition commenced in September 2012. Seasons usually ran from September to October followed by a finals series involving the top two highest-placed teams in each of the two tables of four teams. The national champion gained qualification into the continental competition. Most games were played at the Afghanistan Football Federation Stadium in Kabul.

Since the league's inaugural season, a total of three clubs were crowned Afghan Premier League champions. Shaheen Asmayee, won a record 5 premier league titles. The league was folded in 2020 and was replaced with the Afghanistan Champions League.

== History ==
The Afghan Premier League was established in 2012 replacing the Kabul Premier League, with the first season running through September and October of that year. 8 teams were concurrently established in 2012 to become the inaugural competitors. Before 2012, the league in Afghanistan was broken down into 7 groups that covered the country.

Players for the league were selected with the help of a reality television talent show called Maidan-e-sabz ("The Green Pitch"), helmed by Mukhtar Lashkari, star of Tolo TV, Afghanistan's equivalent of The Oprah Winfrey Show. The concept came from the Afghanistan Football Federation and the Afghanistan-based MOBY Group, which owns a number of TV channels and radio stations and is the largest media group in the country. MOBY Group channels will broadcast matches. Players were voted onto teams by a jury and by the television audience. The 34 provinces were grouped into eight larger zones. Eight teams of 18 players, one from every region, were formed.

The league's creation was described by some analysts as an "unusual shortcut", noting its use of newly created regional teams and a reality television-based player selection system rather than the country's existing club structure.

The Afghan High Peace Council praised the creation and development of the League as an, "opportunity to bring peace and stability" to Afghanistan. The process has given opportunities to minorities such as the Hazara who were treated as a underclass. Many players and supporters had undergone considerable trauma for which the League serves as a form of therapy. Along with the Shpageeza Cricket League which started in 2013, Afghan Premier League football was one of the few big sporting competitions in Afghanistan, offering precious relief from the violence of everyday life.

Shaheen Asmayee FC won a record 5 Afghan Premier League titles (2013, 2014, 2016, 2017, 2020). They were the only team to have reached the Afghan Premier League final in eight consecutive seasons (2013–2020). The league was discontinued after 2020 and replaced with the Afghanistan Champions League.

Although the Afghan Premier League was discontinued after the 2020 season, several of its teams continued to compete in other tournaments. In November 2021, six former APL teams, De Abasin Sape, Oqaban Hindukush, De Maiwand Atalan, Toofan Harirod, Shaheen Asmayee and Simorgh Alborz, competed in the Jam-e Aman in Kabul, which was won by Shaheen Asmayee with 11 points. In January 2022, four APL teams, Shaheen Asmayee, De Maiwand Atalan, Simorgh Alborz and Toofan Harirod, competed in a four-team tournament in Kandahar. Some players boycotted the competition in protest at the absence of a professional national league, and Toofan Harirod won the tournament with five points. A Toofan Harirod Herat side competed in Afghanistan's national under-17 league in 2026.

== Champions ==
Year	Champion	Final result	Runners-up	Top scorer	Goals
2012	Toofan Harirod	2–1	Simorgh Alborz	Hamidullah Karimi (Toofan Harirod)	9
2013	Shaheen Asmayee	3–1 a.e.t.	Simorgh Alborz	Hamidullah Karimi (Toofan Harirod), Hashmatullah Barakzai (Shaheen Asmayee)	7
2014	Shaheen Asmayee	3–2	Oqaban Hindukush	Mohammad Riza Rizayee (Oqaban Hindukush)	6
2015	De Spin Ghar Bazan	3–3 Penalties	Shaheen Asmayee	Mustafa Afshar (De Maiwand Atalan)	5
2016	Shaheen Asmayee	2–1 a.e.t	De Maiwand Atalan	Amredin Sharifi (Shaheen Asmayee)	6
2017	Shaheen Asmayee	4–3 a.e.t.	De Maiwand Atalan	Amredin Sharifi (De Maiwand Atalan)	5
2018	Toofan Harirod	1–0 a.e.t.	Shaheen Asmayee	Yar Mohammad Zakarkhel (Toofaan Harirod)	
2019	Toofan Harirod	1–0 a.e.t.	Shaheen Asmayee	Raoof Qaderi (Shaheen Asmayee)	
2020	Shaheen Asmayee	1–0	Simorgh Alborz	Javid Mirzad (Oqaban Hindukush), Mostafa Rezaei (Simorgh Alborz)	3

== League wins by club ==
Club	Wins	Winning years
Shaheen Asmayee	5	2013, 2014, 2016, 2017, 2020
Toofan Harirod	3	2012, 2018, 2019
De Spin Ghar Bazan	1	2015

== Media coverage ==
Private media group Moby Media Group had the official rights to cover all matches of the APL. The matches were aired live on the company's two television channels in Afghanistan, namely TOLO and Lemar, and also offered live commentary on their radio stations, Arman FM and Arakozia FM.

== Sponsorship ==
Roshan Telecom was the title sponsor of Afghan Premier League after which it was named as Roshan Afghan Premier League from 2012 to at least 2018. Official Partners of Afghan Premier League were Afghanistan International Bank and Hummel International which provided kit for the teams.
