= De Abasin Sape FC =

Association football club

De Abasin Sape
- Full name: De Abasin Sape
- Nickname: Abasin Waves
- Founded: 2012; 14 years ago
- Ground: Khost City Ground, Khost
- Capacity: 18,000
- League: Afghanistan Champions League
Home colours	Away colours

De Abasin Sape (Pashto: د اباسین څپې) or the Abasin Waves is a football club from Afghanistan. They played in the Afghan Premier League.

== Etymology ==
De Abasin Sape is named after Abāsīn (Pashto: اباسین), the Pashto name of the Indus River, a major river in eastern Khyber Pakhtunkhwa and Pakistan. The Kabul River (flowing through Kabul, Nangarhar, and Khyber Pakhtunkhwa provinces) and the Kurram River (which flows through Paktia, Khost, Kurram, and Khyber Pakhtunkhwa) are two major western tributaries flowing from Afghanistan into the Indus river.

== Club history ==
The club was founded in August 2012 by the creation of Afghan Premier League, and played in one of the inaugural games. Club players were chosen through a casting-show called Maidon-E-Sabz ("Green Field").

The club represents South-Eastern region of Afghanistan around Khost.

It is named after a Pashto language name for the Indus River – Abasin ("Father of Rivers").
