= Mawjhai Amu FC =

Afghan football club

Mawjhai Amu
- Full name: Mawjhai Amu Football Club
- Nickname: Amu Waves
- Founded: 2012; 14 years ago
- Ground: Kunduz Ground
- League: Afghan Premier League
Home colours	Away colours

Mawjhai Amu Football Club (Dari: موج‌های آمو) or the Amu Waves is a football team from Afghanistan. It last played in the Afghan Premier League.

== History ==
The club was founded in August 2012 during the creation of Afghan Premier League. Its players have been chosen through a casting-show called Maidan-E-Sabz (Green Field). Based in the city of Kunduz, club represents provinces of Kunduz, Badakhshan, Takhar and Baghlan in the northeastern region of Afghanistan.
