= De Spin Ghar Bazan FC =

Afghan football club

De Spin Ghar Bazan
- Full name: De Spin Ghar Bazan Football Club
- Nickname: Spin Ghar Hawks
- Founded: 2012; 14 years ago
- Ground: Nangarhar Stadium, Jalalabad
- League: Afghan Premier League

De Spin Ghar Bazan Football Club (Pashto: د سپین غر بازان) or the Spin Ghar Hawks, is a football team in Afghanistan. It last played in the Afghan Premier League.

== History ==
Based in the city of Jalalabad, the club represents the provinces of Nangarhar, Laghman, Kapisa, Kunar and Nuristan in the eastern region of Afghanistan.

De Spin Ghar Bazan became the champions of the league by defeating Shaheen Asmayee in a penalty shoot-out, 4–3, after the regulation time and extra time had ended in a goalless draw.

== Continental history ==
Season	Competition	Round
2015	Sheikh Kamal International Club Cup	Semi-finals

== Honours ==
=== Domestic ===
- Afghan Premier League
  - Champions (1): 2015

=== Invitational ===
- Sheikh Kamal International Club Cup
  - Semi-finals (1): 2015
