= De Maiwand Atalan FC =

Association football club

De Maiwand Atalan
- Full name: De Maiwand Atalan Football Club
- Nickname: The Maiwand Champions
- Founded: 2012; 14 years ago
- Ground: Kandahar Stadium, Kandahar
- Capacity: 5,000
- League: Afghan Premier League
Home colours	Away colours

De Maiwand Atalan Football Club (Pashto: د میوند اتلان) (nicknamed the Maiwand Champions) is a football club from Afghanistan. It last played in the Afghan Premier League.

== History ==
It was founded in August 2012 by the creation of Afghan Premier League and its players have been chosen through a casting-show called Maidan-E-Sabz (Green Field).

Based in the city of Kandahar, club represents provinces of Kandahar, Helmand, Urozgan, Nimruz and Zabul in the southern region of Afghanistan.

== Honours ==
=== National ===
- Afghan Premier League

Runners-up (2): 2016, 2017
