= Oqaban Hindukush FC =

Afghan football club

Oqaban Hindukush
- Full name: Oqaban Hindukush
- Nickname: Hindukush Eagles
- Founded: 2012; 14 years ago
- Ground: Ghazni Ground, Ghazni
- League: Afghan Premier League
Home colours	Away colours

Oqaban Hindukush (Persian: عقابان هندوکش) or the Hindukush Eagles is a football club in Afghanistan. They played in the Afghan Premier League.

== History ==
It was founded in August 2012 by the creation of Afghan Premier League and its players have been chosen through a casting-show called Maidan-E-Sabz (Green Field). Based in the city of Ghazni, club represents provinces of Ghazni, Bamyan, Parwan, Panjshir, Daykundi and Wardak in the central region of Afghanistan.

== Honours ==
=== National ===
- Afghan Premier League

Runners-up (1): 2014
