= Toofan Harirod FC =

Afghan football club

Toofan Harirod
- Full name: Toofan Harirod Football Club
- Nickname: Harirod Storm
- Founded: 2012; 14 years ago
- Ground: Herat Stadium, Herat
- League: Afghan Premier League

Toofan Harirod (Persian: توفان هریرود, which translates to Storm of the Harirod), is an Afghan football club. It last played in the Afghan Premier League.

== History ==
The club was founded in August 2012, coinciding with the creation of Afghan Premier League and its players were chosen through a casting-show called Maidan-E-Sabz (Green Field). Based in the city of Herat, the club represents the provinces of Herat, Farah, Ghor, and Badghis in the western region of Afghanistan.

Toofan Harirod became champions of the first season of Premier League, defeating Simorgh Alborz 2–1, in final of the 2012 Afghan Premier League. They earned their second and third title against Shaheen Asmayee in the finals of 2018 and 2019 seasons, by the score of 1–0.

== Honours ==
=== National ===
- Afghan Premier League

Champions (3): 2012, 2018, 2019
