= Simorgh Alborz FC =

Afghan football club

Simorgh Alborz
- Full name: Simorgh Alborz
- Nickname: Alborz Phoenixes Mazar
- Founded: 2012; 14 years ago
- Ground: Balkh Ground, Mazar-i-Sharif
- League: Afghan Premier League
Home colours	Away colours

Simorgh Alborz (Persian: سیمرغ البرز) is a football club from Afghanistan. They played in the Afghan Premier League.

== Etymology ==
The club is named after mythical creature Simorgh – a large, graceful, winged bird – and the sacred mountain Alborz, both famous elements of ancient Persian mythology, referred to in many famous poems and, according to a legend, linked to the region around Balkh and Samangan.

Koh e Alburz is the name of a mountain ridge south of the ancient city of Balkh. Likewise, Simorgh Alborz football team represents north and northwestern Afghanistan, including the historical region of Balkh.

== History ==
It was founded in August 2012 by the creation of Afghan Premier League and its players have been chosen through a casting-show called Maidon-E-Sabz (Green Field). Based in the city of Mazar-i-Sharif, club represents provinces of Balkh, Samangan, Sar-e Pol, Jowzjan and Faryab in the northwestern region of Afghanistan.

They have claimed both runners-up positions in first two years of Afghan Premier League.
