= 2023 CAFA Nations Cup squads =

The following is a list of squads for each nation competing in the 2023 CAFA Nations Cup, held from 10 to 20 June in the cities of (Tashkent, Uzbekistan) and (Bishkek, Kyrgyzstan). Each nation needed to submit a squad of 26 players, including 3 goalkeepers. Iran won the 2023 CAFA championship after beating the Tajikistan team and gaining 12 points. The 2023 CAFA Nations Cup is the first edition of the CAFA Nations Cup, the biennial international men's football championship of Central Asia organized by Central Asian Football Association (CAFA).

== Afghanistan ==
Head coach: (Kuwait) Abdullah Al Mutairi

No.	Pos.	Player	Date of birth (age)	Caps	Goals	Club
1	GK	Faisal Hamidi	16 March 1997 (aged 26)	2	0	Free agent
22	GK	Golali Rahimi		0	0	Free agent
23	GK	Abdul Musawer Attai		0	0	Free agent
2	DF	Amanullah Sardari	22 August 2000 (aged 22)	1	0	(Afghanistan Football Federation) Abu Muslim
3	DF	Hussian Ali Zada		0	0	Free agent
4	DF	Mahboob Hanifi	22 March 1997 (aged 26)	0	0	(Afghanistan Football Federation) Simorgh Alborz
5	DF	Farzad Ataie	30 December 1991 (aged 31)	7	0	(Afghanistan Football Federation) Shaheen Asmayee
12	DF	Baset Moshtaq	18 August 2001 (aged 21)	0	0	(Royal Dutch Football Association) Excelsior Maassluis
13	DF	Ali Baset Nazari	6 November 2001 (aged 21)	0	0	(Afghanistan Football Federation) Attack Energy
6	MF	Samir Samandari	5 November 2002 (aged 20)	0	0	(Afghanistan Football Federation) Attack Energy
8	MF	Farshad Noor (captain)	2 October 1994 (aged 28)	22	2	(Football Association of Brunei Darussalam) DPMM FC
10	MF	Mohammad Noman Walizada	16 November 2002 (aged 20)	0	0	(Afghanistan Football Federation) Istiqlal
14	MF	Hasibullah Ahadi	21 March 2003 (aged 20)	0	0	Free agent
16	MF	Taufee Skandari	2 April 1999 (aged 24)	0	0	(Faroe Islands Football Association) B36 Tórshavn
17	MF	Yama Sherzad	1 January 2001 (aged 22)	0	0	(Swiss Football Association) Xamax
7	FW	Mohammad Rueed Samandari	14 February 1994 (aged 29)	0	0	(Afghanistan Football Federation) Shaheen Asmayee
9	FW	Hatam Shirdel		0	0	(Afghanistan Football Federation) Attack Energy
11	FW	Hossein Zamani	23 November 2002 (aged 20)	1	1	Free agent
15	FW	Yar Mohammad Zakarkhel	8 September 1997 (aged 25)	0	0	(Afghanistan Football Federation) Toofan Harirod
18	FW	Amredin Sharifi	23 March 1992 (aged 31)	16	2	(Bangladesh Football Federation) Fortis FC
19	FW	Omid Musawi	1 January 2001 (aged 22)	4	0	(Cyprus Football Association) Achyronas Onisilos
20	FW	Fareed Sadat	10 January 1998 (aged 25)	4	0	(Football Association of Thailand) Nakhon Si United
21	FW	Munir Ahmad Halimi		0	0	(Afghanistan Football Federation) Aino Mina

== Iran ==
Head coach: (Iran) Amir Ghalenoei

No.	Pos.	Player	Date of birth (age)	Caps	Goals	Club
1	GK	Alireza Beiranvand	21 September 1992 (aged 30)	55	0	(Football Federation Islamic Republic of Iran) Persepolis
12	GK	Payam Niazmand	6 April 1995 (aged 28)	2	0	(Football Federation Islamic Republic of Iran) Sepahan
22	GK	Hossein Pour Hamidi	26 March 1998 (aged 25)	0	0	(Football Federation Islamic Republic of Iran) Aluminium Arak
2	DF	Sadegh Moharrami	1 March 1996 (aged 27)	24	0	(Croatian Football Federation) Dinamo Zagreb
3	DF	Ehsan Hajsafi (captain)	25 February 1990 (aged 33)	126	7	(Hellenic Football Federation) AEK Athens
8	DF	Morteza Pouraliganji	19 April 1992 (aged 31)	49	3	(Football Federation Islamic Republic of Iran) Persepolis
11	DF	Vahid Amiri	2 April 1988 (aged 35)	69	2	(Football Federation Islamic Republic of Iran) Persepolis
13	DF	Hossein Kanaanizadegan	23 March 1994 (aged 29)	38	2	(Qatar Football Association) Al-Ahli
19	DF	Majid Hosseini	20 June 1996 (aged 26)	21	0	(Turkish Football Federation) Kayserispor
23	DF	Ramin Rezaeian	21 March 1990 (aged 33)	50	4	(Football Federation Islamic Republic of Iran) Sepahan
15	MF	Rouzbeh Cheshmi	24 July 1993 (aged 29)	23	2	(Football Federation Islamic Republic of Iran) Esteghlal
25	MF	Alireza Alizadeh	11 February 1993 (aged 30)	0	0	(Football Federation Islamic Republic of Iran) Gol Gohar
6	MF	Saeid Ezatolahi	1 October 1996 (aged 26)	51	1	(Danish Football Association) Vejle
7	MF	Alireza Jahanbakhsh	11 August 1993 (aged 29)	67	13	(Royal Dutch Football Association) Feyenoord
17	MF	Mehdi Ghayedi	5 December 1998 (aged 24)	8	2	(United Arab Emirates Football Association) Shabab Al-Ahli
5	MF	Mohammad Karimi	20 June 1996 (aged 26)	1	0	(Football Federation Islamic Republic of Iran) Sepahan
18	MF	Mohammad Mohebi	20 December 1998 (aged 24)	5	3	(Portuguese Football Federation) Santa Clara
16	MF	Mehdi Torabi	10 September 1994 (aged 28)	40	7	(Football Federation Islamic Republic of Iran) Persepolis
24	MF	Saeid Mehri	16 September 1995 (aged 27)	0	0	(Football Federation Islamic Republic of Iran) Esteghlal
21	MF	Omid Noorafkan	9 April 1997 (aged 26)	16	0	(Football Federation Islamic Republic of Iran) Sepahan
10	MF	Amirhossein Hosseinzadeh	30 October 2000 (aged 22)	3	0	(Royal Belgian Football Association) Charleroi
9	FW	Mehdi Taremi	18 July 1992 (aged 30)	65	30	(Portuguese Football Federation) Porto
4	FW	Shahab Zahedi	18 August 1995 (aged 27)	0	0	(Hungarian Football Federation) Puskás Akadémia
20	FW	Sardar Azmoun	1 January 1995 (aged 28)	68	41	(German Football Association) Bayer Leverkusen
14	FW	Reza Asadi	17 January 1996 (aged 27)	2	0	(Football Federation Islamic Republic of Iran) Tractor

== Kyrgyz Republic ==
Head coach: (Slovakia) Štefan Tarkovič

No.	Pos.	Player	Date of birth (age)	Caps	Goals	Club
	GK	Erzhan Tokotayev	17 July 2000 (aged 22)	11	0	(Kazakhstan Football Federation) Caspiy
	GK	Sultan Chomoev	20 January 2003 (aged 20)	0	0	(Kyrgyz Football Union) Dordoi Bishkek
	GK	Anton Kochenkov	2 April 1987 (aged 36)	0	0	(Russian Football Union) Arsenal Tula
	GK	Artem Pryadkin	18 September 2001 (aged 21)	0	0	(Kyrgyz Football Union) Dordoi Bishkek
	DF	Valery Kichin (captain)	12 October 1992 (aged 30)	40	4	(Russian Football Union) Yenisey Krasnoyarsk
	DF	Khristiyan Brauzman	15 August 2003 (aged 19)	7	0	(Kyrgyz Football Union) Abdysh-Ata Kant
	DF	Ayzar Akmatov	24 August 1998 (aged 24)	15	1	(Kyrgyz Football Union) Abdysh-Ata Kant
	DF	Aleksandr Mishchenko	30 July 1997 (aged 25)	14	0	(Kyrgyz Football Union) Dordoi Bishkek
	DF	Kayrat Zhyrgalbek uulu	13 June 1993 (aged 29)	56	3	(Kazakhstan Football Federation) Aksu
	DF	Tamirlan Kozubayev	1 July 1994 (aged 28)	33	1	(Football Association of Hong Kong, China) Eastern
	DF	Bekzhan Sagynbayev	3 December 1989 (aged 33)	30	4	(Kyrgyz Football Union) Alga Bishkek
	DF	Azamat Baymatov	11 September 1994 (aged 28)	27	3	(Football Association of Hong Kong, China) Kitchee
	DF	Suyuntbek Mamyraliev	7 January 1998 (aged 25)	1	0	(Kyrgyz Football Union) Dordoi Bishkek
	DF	Kayrat Izakov	8 June 1997 (aged 26)	4	0	(Kyrgyz Football Union) Abdysh-Ata Kant
	MF	Erbol Atabayev	15 August 2001 (aged 21)	6	0	(Russian Football Union) Dynamo Makhachkala
	MF	Odilzhon Abdurakhmanov	18 March 1996 (aged 27)	21	1	(Kazakhstan Football Federation) Maktaaral
	MF	Tursunali Rustamov	31 January 1990 (aged 33)	25	6	(Kyrgyz Football Union) Dordoi Bishkek
	MF	Nikolay Davydov	5 April 1998 (aged 25)	0	0	(German Football Association) FC Ismaning
	MF	Gulzhigit Alykulov	25 November 2000 (aged 22)	19	3	Free Agent
	MF	Magamed Uzdenov	25 February 1994 (aged 29)	2	0	(Kyrgyz Football Union) Alga Bishkek
	MF	Raul Dzhalilov	20 July 1994 (aged 28)	1	0	(Kyrgyz Football Union) Alga Bishkek
	MF	Atay Dzhumashev	15 September 1998 (aged 24)	2	0	(Kyrgyz Football Union) Abdysh-Ata Kant
	MF	Kai Merk	28 August 1998 (aged 24)	1	0	(Luxembourg Football Federation) Union Titus Pétange
	MF	Bakhtiyar Duyshobekov	3 June 1995 (aged 28)	33	2	(Kyrgyz Football Union) Alay Osh
	MF	Farkhat Musabekov	3 January 1994 (aged 29)	46	2	Abdysh-Ata Kant
	MF	Azim Azarov	20 September 1996 (aged 26)	4	1	(Kyrgyz Football Union) Dordoi Bishkek
	FW	Eldar Moldozhunusov	15 September 1995 (aged 27)	9	1	(Kyrgyz Football Union) Neftchi Kochkor-Ata
	FW	Joel Kojo	21 August 1998 (aged 24)	0	0	(Uzbekistan Football Association) Dinamo Samarqand
	FW	Ernist Batyrkanov	21 February 1998 (aged 25)	15	1	(Football Association of Malaysia) Kelantan United
	FW	Mirlan Murzayev	29 March 1990 (aged 33)	55	15	(Vietnam Football Federation) Hanoi Football Club
	FW	Beknaz Almazbekov	23 June 2005 (aged 17)	1	0	(Turkish Football Federation) Galatasaray
	FW	Anton Zemlyanukhin	11 December 1988 (aged 34)	30	13	(Kyrgyz Football Union) Alga Bishkek
	FW	Maksat Alygulov	21 December 2000 (aged 22)	0	0	(Kyrgyz Football Union) Abdysh-Ata Kant

== Oman ==
Head coach: (Croatia) Branko Ivankovic

No.	Pos.	Player	Date of birth (age)	Caps	Goals	Club
1	GK	Ibrahim Al-Mukhaini	20 June 1997 (age 28)	8	0	(Oman Football Association) Al-Nahda
18	GK	Faiz Al-Rushaidi	19 July 1988 (age 37)	62	0	(Oman Football Association) Al-Suwaiq
22	GK	Ahmed Al-Rawahi	5 May 1994 (age 32)	5	0	(Oman Football Association) Al-Seeb
2	DF	Samih Al-Hamrashdi		1	0	(Oman Football Association) Al-Rustaq
3	DF	Fahmi Durbin	10 October 1993 (age 32)	22	0	(Oman Football Association) Al-Nasr
5	DF	Juma Al-Habsi	28 January 1996 (age 30)	20	0	(Oman Football Association) Al-Seeb
6	DF	Ahmed Al-Khamisi	26 November 1991 (age 34)	19	0	(Oman Football Association) Al-Suwaiq
10	DF	Jameel Al-Yahmadi	27 July 1996 (age 29)	39	2	(Qatar Football Association) Al-Markhiya
13	DF	Ahmed Al-Matrooshi	26 May 1997 (age 29)	1	0	(Oman Football Association) Al-Nahda
14	DF	Ahmed Al-Kaabi	15 September 1996 (age 29)	13	0	(Oman Football Association) Al-Nahda
16	DF	Khalid Al-Braiki	3 July 1993 (age 32)	14	0	(Oman Football Association) Al-Suwaiq
19	DF	Mahmood Al-Mushaifri	14 January 1993 (age 33)	21	0	(Oman Football Association) Al-Suwaiq
4	MF	Arshad Al-Alawi	12 April 2000 (age 26)	21	4	(United Arab Emirates Football Association) Emirates
8	MF	Zahir Al-Aghbari	28 May 1999 (age 26)	18	0	(Bahrain Football Association) Al-Khaldiya
12	MF	Abdullah Fawaz	3 October 1996 (age 29)	20	5	(Oman Football Association) Dhofar
17	MF	Mataz Saleh	28 May 1996 (age 29)	12	1	(Oman Football Association) Dhofar
15	MF	Musab Al-Mamari	22 January 2000 (age 26)	2	0	(Oman Football Association) Al-Rustaq
20	MF	Salaah Al-Yahyaei	17 August 1998 (age 27)	35	6	(Oman Football Association) Al-Seeb
23	MF	Harib Al-Saadi	1 February 1990 (age 36)	55	0	(Oman Football Association) Al-Suwaiq
7	FW	Issam Al-Sabhi	1 May 1997 (age 29)	17	4	(Oman Football Association) Al-Suwaiq
9	FW	Omar Al-Malki	4 January 1994 (age 32)	3	1	(Bahrain Football Association) Al-Riffa
11	FW	Muhsen Al-Ghassani	27 March 1997 (age 29)	30	6	(Oman Football Association) Al-Seeb
21	FW	Abdulrahman Al-Mushaifri	16 August 1998 (age 27)	0	0	(Oman Football Association) Al-Seeb

== Tajikistan ==
Head coach: (Croatia) Petar Šegrt

No.	Pos.	Player	Date of birth (age)	Caps	Goals	Club
	GK	Rustam Yatimov	13 July 1998 (aged 24)	31	0	(Tajikistan Football Federation) Istiklol
	GK	Shokhrukh Kirgizboev	1 May 2002 (aged 21)	6	0	(Tajikistan Football Federation) Khujand
	GK	Mukhriddin Khasanov	23 September 2002 (aged 20)	1	0	(Tajikistan Football Federation) Istiklol
	DF	Akhtam Nazarov (captain)	29 September 1992 (aged 30)	71	5	(Uzbekistan Football Association) Andijon
	DF	Siyovush Asrorov	21 July 1992 (aged 30)	46	0	(Tajikistan Football Federation) Istiklol
	DF	Zoir Dzhuraboyev	16 September 1998 (aged 24)	25	1	(Uzbekistan Football Association) Neftchi Fergana
	DF	Manuchekhr Safarov	31 May 2001 (aged 22)	24	0	(Uzbekistan Football Association) Lokomotiv Tashkent
	DF	Tabrezi Davlatmir	6 June 1998 (aged 25)	24	0	(Tajikistan Football Federation) Istiklol
	DF	Vakhdat Khanonov	25 July 2000 (aged 22)	18	0	(Football Federation Islamic Republic of Iran) Persepolis
	DF	Daler Imomnazarov	31 May 1995 (aged 28)	4	0	(Tajikistan Football Federation) Istiklol
	DF	Mekhrubon Karimov	9 January 2004 (aged 19)	3	0	(Georgian Football Federation) Samgurali Tsqaltubo
	DF	Kholmurod Nazarov	4 February 1992 (aged 31)	0	0	(Tajikistan Football Federation) Ravshan Kulob
	DF	Sodikjon Kurbonov	19 January 2003 (aged 20)	0	0	(Tajikistan Football Federation) Istiklol
	MF	Amirbek Juraboev	13 April 1996 (aged 27)	48	0	(Football Association of Malaysia) Kedah Darul Aman
	MF	Mukhammadzhon Rakhimov	15 October 1998 (aged 24)	44	2	(Uzbekistan Football Association) Nasaf
	MF	Ehson Panjshanbe	12 May 1999 (aged 24)	40	4	(Tajikistan Football Federation) Istiklol
	MF	Parvizdzhon Umarbayev	1 November 1994 (aged 28)	38	7	(Bulgarian Football Union) CSKA 1948
	MF	Komron Tursunov	24 April 1996 (aged 27)	26	6	(All India Football Federation) TRAU
	MF	Alisher Dzhalilov	29 August 1993 (aged 29)	16	5	(Tajikistan Football Federation) Istiklol
	MF	Alidzhoni Ayni	6 August 2004 (aged 18)	7	0	(Tajikistan Football Federation) Istiklol
	MF	Murodali Aknazarov	19 November 2004 (aged 18)	0	0	(Turkish Football Federation) Antalyaspor
	MF	Khusrav Toirov	1 August 2004 (aged 18)	0	0	(Ukrainian Association of Football) Shakhtar Donetsk
	FW	Manuchekhr Dzhalilov	27 September 1990 (aged 32)	48	20	(Tajikistan Football Federation) Istiklol
	FW	Shervoni Mabatshoev	4 December 2000 (aged 22)	13	3	(Tajikistan Football Federation) Istiklol
	FW	Nuriddin Khamrokulov	25 October 1999 (aged 23)	7	0	(Tajikistan Football Federation) Regar-TadAZ
	FW	Muhammadali Azizboev	4 January 2003 (aged 20)	0	0	(Tajikistan Football Federation) Khosilot Farkhor

== Turkmenistan ==
Head coach: (Turkmenistan) Mergen Orazow

No.	Pos.	Player	Date of birth (age)	Caps	Goals	Club
	GK	Rasul Çaryýew	30 September 1999 (aged 23)	2	0	(Football Federation of Turkmenistan) Arkadag
	GK	Batyr Babaýew	21 August 1991 (aged 31)	1	0	(Football Federation of Turkmenistan) Altyn Asyr
	GK	Dowletyar Berdyew	5 May 1998 (aged 25)	0	0	(Football Federation of Turkmenistan) Köpetdag Asgabat
	DF	Yhlas Toyjanow	8 January 2001 (aged 22)	0	0	(Football Federation of Turkmenistan) Arkadag
	DF	Abdy Bäşimow	12 December 1995 (aged 27)	7	1	(Football Federation of Turkmenistan) Arkadag
	DF	Güýçmyrat Annagulyýew	10 June 1996 (aged 27)	7	2	(Football Federation of Turkmenistan) Arkadag
	DF	Ýbraýym Mämmedow	13 January 1996 (aged 27)	0	0	(Football Federation of Turkmenistan) Arkadag
	DF	Mekan Saparow	22 April 1994 (aged 29)	30	1	(Football Federation of Turkmenistan) Arkadag
	DF	Arzuwguli Saparguliyew	27 July 2001 (aged 21)	0	0	(Football Federation of Turkmenistan) Arkadag
	DF	Ata Geldiýew	27 January 1990 (aged 33)	0	0	(Football Federation of Turkmenistan) Ahal
	MF	Ilýa Tamurkin	9 May 1989 (aged 34)	11	0	(Football Federation of Turkmenistan) Arkadag
	MF	Resul Hojaýew	1 June 1997 (aged 26)	11	1	(Football Federation of Turkmenistan) Arkadag
	MF	Welmyrad Ballakow	4 April 1999 (aged 24)	0	0	(Football Federation of Turkmenistan) Arkadag
	MF	Yhlas Saparmämmedow	25 February 1997 (aged 26)	4	0	(Football Federation of Turkmenistan) Arkadag
	MF	Sanazar Tirkisow	16 February 1997 (aged 26)	0	0	(Football Federation of Turkmenistan) Arkadag
	MF	Begmyrad Bayow	5 July 1998 (aged 24)	0	0	(Football Federation of Turkmenistan) Arkadag
	MF	Begenç Akmämmedow	1 June 1998 (aged 25)	2	0	(Football Federation of Turkmenistan) Arkadag
	MF	Ahmet Ataýew	19 September 1990 (aged 32)	32	1	(Football Federation of Turkmenistan) Altyn Asyr
	MF	Myrat Annaýew	6 May 1993 (aged 30)	11	0	(Football Federation of Turkmenistan) Altyn Asyr
	MF	Mirza Beknazarow	15 May 2000 (aged 23)	0	0	(Estonian Football Association) Nava Trans
	FW	Didar Durdyýew	16 July 1993 (aged 29)	14	2	(Football Federation of Turkmenistan) Arkadag
	FW	Arslanmyrat Amanow (captain)	28 March 1990 (aged 33)	53	14	(Football Federation of Turkmenistan) Arkadag
	FW	Altymyrat Annadurdyýew	13 April 1993 (aged 30)	25	9	(Football Federation of Turkmenistan) Arkadag
	FW	Meýlis Dinýiew	11 July 2000 (aged 22)	0	0	(Football Federation of Turkmenistan) Ahal
	FW	Teymur Charyyew	26 November 2000 (aged 22)	0	0	(Kyrgyz Football Union) Abdysh-Ata

== Uzbekistan ==
Head coach: (Slovenia) Srečko Katanec

No.	Pos.	Player	Date of birth (age)	Caps	Goals	Club
1	GK	Utkir Yusupov	4 January 1991 (age 35)	13	0	(Uzbekistan Football Association) Navbahor Namangan
12	GK	Abduvohid Nematov	20 March 2001 (age 25)	6	0	(Uzbekistan Football Association) Nasaf
16	GK	Botirali Ergashev	23 June 1995 (age 30)	1	0	(Uzbekistan Football Association) AGMK
2	DF	Alibek Davronov	28 December 2002 (age 23)	1	0	(Uzbekistan Football Association) Nasaf
3	DF	Khojiakbar Alijonov	19 April 1997 (age 29)	23	0	(Uzbekistan Football Association) Pakhtakor Tashkent
4	DF	Farrukh Sayfiev	17 January 1991 (age 35)	39	1	(Uzbekistan Football Association) Pakhtakor Tashkent
5	DF	Abdukodir Khusanov	29 February 2004 (age 22)	0	0	(Football Federation of Belarus) Energetik-BGU Minsk
13	DF	Sherzod Nasrullaev	23 July 1998 (age 27)	7	0	(Uzbekistan Football Association) Nasaf
15	DF	Umar Eshmurodov	30 November 1992 (age 33)	13	0	(Uzbekistan Football Association) Nasaf
22	DF	Dilshod Saitov	2 February 1999 (age 27)	5	0	(Uzbekistan Football Association) Nasaf
28	DF	Ibrokhimkhalil Yuldoshev	14 February 2001 (age 25)	15	1	(Russian Football Union) Nizhny Novgorod
7	MF	Otabek Shukurov	22 June 1996 (age 29)	52	3	(Turkish Football Federation) Fatih Karagümrük
8	MF	Jamshid Iskanderov	16 October 1993 (age 32)	25	3	(Uzbekistan Football Association) Navbahor Namangan
9	MF	Odiljon Hamrobekov	13 February 1996 (age 30)	33	0	(Uzbekistan Football Association) Pakhtakor Tashkent
11	MF	Oston Urunov	19 December 2000 (age 25)	10	2	(Uzbekistan Football Association) Navbahor Namangan
17	MF	Sardor Sabirkhodjaev	6 September 1994 (age 31)	14	0	(Uzbekistan Football Association) Pakhtakor Tashkent
18	MF	Abdulla Abdullaev	1 September 1997 (age 28)	9	0	(Uzbekistan Football Association) AGMK
20	MF	Akmal Mozgovoy	2 April 2000 (age 26)	8	0	(Uzbekistan Football Association) Nasaf
27	MF	Jamshid Boltaboev	3 October 1996 (age 29)	1	0	(Uzbekistan Football Association) Navbahor Namangan
10	FW	Jaloliddin Masharipov	1 September 1993 (age 32)	46	9	(Saudi Arabian Football Federation) Al-Nassr
14	FW	Eldor Shomurodov (captain)	29 June 1995 (age 30)	63	34	(Italian Football Federation) Spezia
19	FW	Azizbek Turgunboev	1 October 1994 (age 31)	19	1	(Uzbekistan Football Association) Pakhtakor Tashkent
23	FW	Jasurbek Yakhshiboev	24 June 1997 (age 28)	5	1	(Uzbekistan Football Association) Navbahor Namangan
24	FW	Bobur Abdikholikov	23 April 1997 (age 29)	5	0	(Kazakhstan Football Federation) Ordabasy
25	FW	Khojimat Erkinov	29 May 2001 (age 24)	15	2	(Russian Football Union) Torpedo Moscow
26	FW	Abbosbek Fayzullaev	3 October 2003 (age 22)	0	0	(Uzbekistan Football Association) Pakhtakor Tashkent
