= 2025–26 Afghanistan Champions League =

Afghanistan Champions League
- Season: 2025
- Dates: 22 November 2025–19 December 2025
- Champions: Abu Muslim (2nd titles)
- Relegated: (substituted off) Jawanan Perouzi; (substituted off) Ettefaq Khanzada
- AFC Challenge League: (substituted on) Abu Muslim
- Matches: 45 Matches
- Best Player: Moshtagh Yaghoubi (Abu Muslim)
- Top goalscorer: Farhad Alizada (Abu Muslim) (9 goals)
- Best goalkeeper: Ovays Azizi (Abu Muslim) (7 Clean Sheets)
- Highest scoring: Sorkh Poshan 6–1 Ettefaq Khanzada (26 November 2025)
- Longest winning run: Abu Muslim (9 Matches)
- Longest unbeaten run: Abu Muslim (9 Matches)
- Longest winless run: Ettefaq Khanzada (9 Matches)
- Longest losing run: Ettefaq Khanzada (8 Matches)
- Highest attendance: 44
- Lowest attendance: 333
- Average attendance: 1120

The 2025 Afghan Champions League was the fifth season of the Afghanistan Champions League, the Afghan league for football clubs, since its inception in 2021. The season began on 22 November 2025 and ended on 19 December 2025. 10 teams participated in a total of 45 matches. All matches were held at the Afghanistan Football Federation Stadium in Kabul. The champion of the season qualified for the 2027–26 AFC Challenge League Preliminary stage.

In the end, Abu Muslim won the league decisively for the second consecutive year with 9 wins out of 9 matches, no draws or losses, 30 goals scored and only 2 conceded.

== Summary ==
Abu Muslim team won the championship, while Sorkh Poshan and Sarrafan FC teams came second and third respectively. Arman FC and Ettefaq Khanzada teams were making their first appearance in the Afghan Football Champions League.

10 teams from different provinces of Afghanistan participated in the competition, of which Jawanan Perouzi Kabul and Ettefaq Khanzada Kandahar were relegated to their respective provincial leagues.

== Teams ==
10 teams from 5 provinces participated in the league. Kabul had 3 representatives. Herat, Faryab and Kandahar each had 2 representatives and Farah had 1 representative.

No.	Clubs	Province
1	Arman	Kabul
2	Abu Muslim	Farah
3	Aino Mina	Kandahar
4	Ettefaq Khanzada	Kandahar
5	Istiqlal	Kabul
6	Jawanan Perouzi	Kabul
7	Khurasan	Faryab
8	Sorkh Poshan	Herat
9	Sarsabz Yashlar	Faryab
10	Sarrafan	Herat

== League table ==
Pos	Team	Pld	W	D	L	GF	GA	GD	Pts	Qualification or relegation
1	Abu Muslim (C, Q)	9	9	0	0	30	2	+28	27	Champion and Qualification for the 2026–27 AFC Challenge League preliminary
2	Sorkh Poshan	9	8	0	1	31	4	+27	24	
3	Sarrafan	9	5	2	2	12	11	+1	17	
4	Arman	9	4	1	4	14	7	+7	13	
5	Khurasan	9	3	3	3	10	11	−1	12	
6	Aino Mina	9	3	1	5	9	22	−13	10	
7	Istiqlal	9	2	2	5	11	27	−16	8 (Note: Head-to-head points : Istiqlal 3, Sarsabz Yashlar 0.)	
8	Sarsabz Yashlar	9	2	2	5	9	14	−5	8	
9	Jawanan Perouzi (R)	9	1	4	4	4	13	−9	7	Relegation to Provincial Leagues
10	Ettefaq Khanzada (R)	9	0	1	8	8	27	−19	1	Relegation to Provincial Leagues

Source: Sofascore
(C) Champions; (Q) Qualified for the phase indicated; (R) Relegated

== Award ==
Award	Recipient	Club
Top Score	Farhad Alizada	Abu Muslim
Best Player	Moshtagh Yaghoubi	Abu Muslim
Best Goalkeeper	Ovays Azizi	Abu Muslim
Golden Boy	Yaser Safi	Sorkh Poshan
Best Coach	Masoud Nazarzadeh	Abu Muslim
Fair Player	Ali Reza Panahi	Abu Muslim
Fair Play	—N/a	Sarrafan
