= 2024–25 Afghanistan Champions League =

Afghanistan Champions League
- Season: 2024–25
- Dates: 6 December 2024 – 7 January 2025
- Champions: Abu Muslim; 1st title
- Relegated: Adalat Farah; Khadim
- AFC Challenge League playoff: Abu Muslim
- Matches: 55
- Goals: 154 (2.8 per match)
- Best player: Zelfy Nazary (Abu Muslim)
- Top goalscorer: Farhad Alizada (FC Sorkh Poshan) (18 goals)
- Best goalkeeper: Faisal Hamidi (Attack Energy) (7 Clean Sheets)
- Highest scoring: Abu Muslim FC 8–0 Adalat FC (25 December 2024)
- Longest winning run: Abu Muslim FC (8 matches)
- Longest unbeaten run: Abu Muslim FC; Attack Energy SC (11 matches)
- Longest winless run: Adalat FC (6 matches)
- Longest losing run: Adalat FC (6 matches)

The 2024–25 Afghanistan Champions League was the fourth season of the Afghanistan Champions League, the top-flight football league in Afghanistan. All matches were held at Herat Football Federation Stadium in Herat.

Attack Energy were defending champions, having won the 2024 edition. Abu Muslim dethroned Attack Energy, winning their first title.

== Teams ==
Team	Location
Abu Muslim	Farah
Adalat Farah	Farah
Aino Mina	Kandahar
Attack Energy	Herat
Istiqlal	Kabul
~~Khadim~~ (Note: Khadim was disqualified by the Afghanistan Football Federation on 6 January 2025, after violating the competition's regulations.)	Sar-e Pol
Khurasan	Faryab
Mawj Sahel Sahet	Takhar
Perrozi Kabul	Kabul
Sarafan	Herat
Sarsabz Yashlar	Faryab
Sorkh Poshan	Herat

== Controversies ==
Khadim Sarpol withdrew from the competition by filing a complaint on 3 January 2025. Through an official letter to the Afghanistan Football Federation, the team complained about hosting matches in Herat Province. Attack Energy SC objected to the way the Abu Muslim FC won the championship, condemning them and Adalat for collusion.

== League table ==
Pos	Team	Pld	W	D	L	GF	GA	GD	Pts	Qualification or relegation
1	Abu Muslim (C)	10	9	1	0	29	4	+25	28	Qualification for the 2025–26 AFC Challenge League preliminary stage
2	Attack Energy	10	9	1	0	25	3	+22	28	
3	Sorkh Poshan	10	8	0	2	25	10	+15	24	
4	Istiqlal	10	4	1	5	9	22	−13	13	
5	Sarrafan	10	3	3	4	8	10	−2	12	
6	Khurasan	10	3	3	4	11	18	−7	12	
7	Sarsabz Yashlar	10	3	2	5	13	13	0	11	
8	Mawj Sahel Sehat	10	3	0	7	8	15	−7	9	
9	Aino Mina	10	2	2	6	7	14	−7	8	
10	Perozi Kabul	10	2	2	6	9	21	−12	8	
11	Adalat Farah (R)	10	0	3	7	10	24	−14	3	Relegation to Provincial Leagues
12	Khadim (Note: The Afghanistan Football Federation announced the disqualification of Khadim after violating the competition's regulations.) (D, R)	0	0	0	0	0	0	0	0	Relegation to Provincial Leagues

Updated to match(es) played on 7 January 2025. Source: Sofascore
(C) Champions; (D) Disqualified; (R) Relegated

== Results ==
Home \ Away	ABM	ADF	AIM	ATK	IFC	KHA	KHU	MSS	PRK	SFC	SRY	SKP
Abu Muslim	—	—	—	0–0	—	—	—	—	—	1–0	3–1	—
Adalat Farah	0–8	—	0–0	—	2–3	—	—	0–1	1–2	0–0	2–2	—
Aino Mina	1–2	—	—	—	—	—	—	1–3	—		0–3	—
Attack Energy	—	2–1	3–0	—	—	—	—	2–0	—	—	2–0	2–1
Istiqlal	0–4	—	0–2	0–6	—	—	2–2	—	—	—	1–0	—
Khadim	—	—	—	—	—	—	—	—	– (Note: Originally scheduled on 6 January. The match was cancelled after the disqualification of Khadim.)	—	—	—
Khurasan	0–4	2–3	1–1	0–2	—	—	—	—	3–1	0–0	—	1–4
Mawj Sahel Sehat	0–3	—	—	—	0–1	—	2–0	—	—	1–2	0–3	0–1
Perozi Kabul	1–2	—	0–2	0–4	0–1	—	—	2–1	—	—	1–1	—
Sarrafan	—	—	—	1–2	2–0	—	—		0–0	—	—	1–4
Sarsabz Yashlar	—	—	—	—	—	—	0–1	—	—	2–1	—	—
Sorkh Poshan	0–1	3–2	1–0	—	4–1	—	—	—	5–1	—	2–1	—

Updated to match(es) played on 7 January 2025. Source: Sofascore
Legend: Blue = home team win; Yellow = draw; Red = away team win.
For upcoming matches, an "a" indicates there is an article about the rivalry between the two participants.

== Awards ==
Award	Recipient	Club
Top scorer	Farhad Alizadeh	Sorkh Poshan
Most Valuable Player	Zelfy Nazary	Abu Muslim
Best goalkeeper	Faisal Hamidi	Attack Energy
Best coach	Yusuf Mohandezadeh	Sorkh Poshan
Fair play	N/A	Aino Mina
