= 2024 Afghanistan Champions League =

Afghanistan Champions League
- Season: 2024
- Dates: 20 April – 22 May
- Champions: Attack Energy FC
- Best Player: Hamid Amiri
- Top goalscorer: Ahmad Nabi Muqdas
- Best goalkeeper: Faisal Hamidi

The 2024 Afghanistan Champions League was the third season of Afghanistan Champions League, the Afghan league for football clubs, since its establishment in 2021. The season began on 20 April. Twelve clubs participated for a total of sixty-six matches. All matches were played at the 6,000-capacity Afghanistan Football Federation Stadium in Kabul.

Attack Energy, who were the defending champions since the 2022 season after the league was not held in 2023, won their second consecutive title after finishing the season unbeaten by winning all of their 11 matches.

== Teams ==
The following 12 teams competed in the 2024 Afghanistan Champions League season.

| Club | Location |
|---|---|
| Khurasan FC | Faryab |
| Khadim FC | Sar-e Pol |
| Istiqlal Kabul FC | Kabul |
| Abu Muslim Farah FC | Farah |
| Maiwand FC | Helmand |
| Jawanan Wahidy FC | Kunduz |
| Sorkh Poshan | Herat |
| Aino Mina FC | Kandahar |
| Mawj Sahel FC | Takhar |
| Sarsabz Yashlar FC | Faryab |
| Attack Energy | Herat |
| Adalat Farah FC | Farah |

== Results ==
=== Round 1 ===
| 20 April 2024 | Abu Muslim | 2-0 | Sarsabz Yashlar | Afghanistan Football Federation Stadium, Kabul |
| 13:00 | Sohrab Afghan 69', Shayak Dost 75' | | | Referee: Ashraf |

| 20 April 2024 | Sorkh Poshan | 1-0 | Khurasan | Afghanistan Football Federation Stadium, Kabul |
| 15:30 | Mashood Azadani 90+7' | | | Referee: Gul Ahmad Khairi |

| 21 April 2024 | Istiqlal | 0-3 | Aino Mina | Afghanistan Football Federation Stadium, Kabul |
| 13:00 | | | Hamid Noorzooi 8', Nabi Moqadas 34', 59' | Referee: Hamid Mohammadi |

| 21 April 2024 | Khadim | 0-3 | Attack Energy | Afghanistan Football Federation Stadium, Kabul |
| 15:30 | | | Alireza Panahi 48', Behnam Habibi 61', Mahbob Hanifi 64' | Referee: Ashraf Hussainzada |

| 22 April 2024 | Wahidy | 0-1 | Mawj Sahil | Afghanistan Football Federation Stadium, Kabul |
| 13:00 | | | Shah Nasir Nori 19' | Referee: Danish Ahmadi |

| 22 April 2024 | Adalat Farah | 1-2 | Maiwand | Afghanistan Football Federation Stadium, Kabul |
| 15:30 | Abdul Ali Wahidi 36' | | Rahimullah Hamasi 45+2', Ar.Rahman Mohammadi 77' | Referee: Gul Ahmad Khairi |

=== Round 2 ===
| 23 April 2024 | Abu Muslim | 6-0 | Khurasan | Afghanistan Football Federation Stadium, Kabul |
| 13:00 | Amanullah Sardari 27', M.Sohrab Afghan 34', M.Sohrab Afghan 43', M.Sohrab Afghan 47', Ahmad Khalid Majidi 65', Amanullah Sardari 88' | | | Referee: Sami Qarizada |

| 23 April 2024 | Sarsabz Yashlar | 0-4 | Aino Mina | Afghanistan Football Federation Stadium, Kabul |
| 15:30 | | | Ahlullah Darman 03', Ramin Hamidi 38', Ahmad Nabi Moqadas 80', Khalil Ahmad Badusha 90+4' | Referee: Hamid Mohammadi |

| 24 April 2024 | Sorkh Poshan | 0-1 | Attack Energy | Afghanistan Football Federation Stadium, Kabul |
| 13:00 | | | Samir Samandari, 88' | Referee: Gul Ahmad |

| 24 April 2024 | Istiqlal | 2-1 | Mawj Sahil | Afghanistan Football Federation Stadium, Kabul |
| 15:30 | Ali Reza Hashimi 18', Hamid Ghulami 80' | | Milad Hamati, 20' | Referee: Jawid Azizi |

| 25 April 2024 | Khadim | 2-0 | Maiwand | Afghanistan Football Federation Stadium, Kabul |
| 13:00 | Farid Bakhtiyar 32', Nasim Muradi, 86' | | | Referee: Hamid Mohammadi |

| 25 April 2024 | Wahidy | 1-1 | Adalat Farah | Afghanistan Football Federation Stadium, Kabul |
| 15:30 | Junaid Ahmad Shah 21' | | Samullah Naderi, 05' | Referee: Ashraf Hussainzada |

=== Round 3 ===
| 26 April 2024 | Khurasan | 0-5 | Attack Energy | Afghanistan Football Federation Stadium, Kabul |
| 13:00 | | | Khalid Ahmad Ahmadi 44', Emmanuel Okorie 52', Emmanuel Okorie 70', Yar Mohammad Zakar Khil 79', Emmanuel Okorie 86', | Referee: Ashraf Hussainzada |

| 26 April 2024 | Abu Muslim | 2-1 | Aino Mina | Afghanistan Football Federation Stadium, Kabul |
| 15:30 | Sohrab Afghan 44', Nematullah Karimi 80' | | Rashid Nazari, 74' | Referee: Hamid Mohammadi |

| 27 April 2024 | Sarsabz Yashlar | 1-2 | Mawj Sahil | Afghanistan Football Federation Stadium, Kabul |
| 13:0 | M.Nasir Niazi 90+8' | | Mir M.Sanan Rahimi 89', Esmat Hadfmand, 90+8' | Referee: Danish Ahmadi |

| 27 April 2024 | Sorkh Poshan | 6-0 | Maiwand | Afghanistan Football Federation Stadium, Kabul |
| 15:30 | Habibullah Hotak 10', Samir Mirzayee 12', Hamid Amiri 14', Omid Rajabi 43', Omid Rajabi 64', Farhad Alizada 90' | | | Referee: Said Samim Hosaini |

| 28 April 2024 | Istiqlal | 2-1 | Adalat Farah | Afghanistan Football Federation Stadium, Kabul |
| 13:00 | M.Rueed Samandari 20', Ali Reza Hashimi 60' | | Mohammad Nawid Afghan 90+2' (o.g.), | Referee: Gul Ahmad |

| 28 April 2024 | Khadim | 6-0 | Wahidy | Afghanistan Football Federation Stadium, Kabul |
| 15:30 | Ali Abdul Ghafor 18', Nasim Muradi 51', Shahzada Sancharaki 69', Shahzada Sancharaki 77', Wared Nafi 85', Nasim Muradi 90+4' | | | Referee: Said Samim Hosaini |

=== Round 4 ===
| 29 April 2024 | Abu Muslim | 0-4 | Attack Energy | Afghanistan Football Federation Stadium, Kabul |
| 13:00 | | | Khalil Ahmad Ahmadi 16', Yar M.Zakarkhil 33', Khalil Ahmad Ahmadi 61', Ali Reza Panhai 74' | Referee: Sayed Nangyali Sadat |

| 29 April 2024 | Aino Mina | 0-3 | Mawj Sahil | Afghanistan Football Federation Stadium, Kabul |
| 15:30 | | | Esmat Hadafmand 25', M.Nazir Azizi 64', Yasar Salaam 73' | Referee: Hamid Mohammadi |

| 30 April 2024 | Khurasan | 3-1 | Maiwand | Afghanistan Football Federation Stadium, Kabul |
| 13:00 | Hayatullah Salimi 09', Murtaza Jafari 26', Ramin Eshani 73' | | Rahimullah Hamasi 47' | Referee: Danish Ahmadi |

| 30 April 2024 | Sarsabz Yashlar | 2-0 | Adalat Farah | Afghanistan Football Federation Stadium, Kabul |
| 15:30 | Ahmad Farhad Adel 34', Enayatullah Kohi 61' | | | Referee: Ashraf Hussainzada |

| 01 May 2024 | Sorkh Poshan | 3-0 | Wahidy | Afghanistan Football Federation Stadium, Kabul |
| 13:00 | Farhad Alizada 47', Hameed Amiri 82', Masoud Azadani 90+4' | | | Referee: Ashraf Hussainzada |

| 01 May 2024 | Istiqlal | 1-2 | Khadim | Afghanistan Football Federation Stadium, Kabul |
| 15:30 | Hamid Ghulami 47' | | Shahzada Sancharaki 26', Shahzada Sancharaki 28' | Referee: Hamid Mohammadi |

=== Round 5 ===
| 02 May 2024 | Abu Muslim | 2-1 | Mawj Sahil | Afghanistan Football Federation Stadium, Kabul |
| 13:00 | S.Hashmat Ahmadi 07', M.Sohrab Afghan 24' | | Yasar Salaam 47' | Referee: Gul Ahmad |

| 02 May 2024 | Attack Energy | 3-0 | Maiwand | Afghanistan Football Federation Stadium, Kabul |
| 15:30 | Emmanuel Okorie 05', Emmanuel Okorie 53', Emmanuel Okorie 64' | | | Referee: Gul Ahmad |

| 03 May 2024 | Aino Mina | 2-1 | Adalat Farah | Afghanistan Football Federation Stadium, Kabul |
| 13:00 | Ahmad Nabi Moqadas 79', Khalil Ahmad Badusha 81' | | Abdul Ali Wahedi 55' | Referee: Gul Ahmad Khairi |

| 03 May 2024 | Khurasan | 2-1 | Wahidy | Afghanistan Football Federation Stadium, Kabul |
| 15:30 | Hedayatullah Salimi 45+2', Hedayatullah Salimi 49' | | Farzad Barekzai 65' | Referee: Gul Ahmad |

| 04 May 2024 | Sarsabz Yashlar | 2-1 | Khadim | Afghanistan Football Federation Stadium, Kabul |
| 13:00 | Khal Mohammad Sultani 11', Atiqullah Khairi 51' | | Nasim Muradi 23' | Referee: Hamid Mohammadi |

| 04 May 2024 | Sorkh Poshan | 6-0 | Istiqlal | Afghanistan Football Federation Stadium, Kabul |
| 15:30 | Omid Rajabi 17', Masoud Azadani 47', Farhad Alizada 57', Arash Samadi 68', Omid Rajabi 75', Omid Rajabi 80' | | | Referee: Ashraf Hussainzada |

=== Round 6 ===
| 5 May 2024 | Adalat | 3-0 | Mawj Sahel |

| 5 May 2024 | Abu Muslim | 9-1 | Maiwand |

| 6 May 2024 | Attack Energy | 7-0 | Wahidy |

| 6 May 2024 | Aino Mina | 3-1 | Khadim |

| 7 May 2024 | Khurasan | 1-0 | Istiqlal |

| 7 May 2024 | Sarsabz Yashlar | 1-4 | Sorkh Poshan |

=== Round 7 ===
| 8 May 2024 | Abu Muslim | 0-0 | Adalat |

| 8 May 2024 | Maiwand | 2-0 | Wahidy |

| 9 May 2024 | Mawj Sahel | 0-0 | Khadim |

| 9 May 2024 | Attack Energy | 3-0 | Istiqlal |

| 10 May 2024 | Aino Mina | 0-1 | Sorkh Poshan |

| 10 May 2024 | Khurasan | 0-2 | Sarsabz Yashlar |

=== Round 8 ===
| 11 May 2024 | Adalat | 6-2 | Khadim |

| 11 May 2024 | Abu Muslim | 7-0 | Wahidy |

| 12 May 2024 | Maiwand | 3-4 | Istiqlal |

| 12 May 2024 | Mawj Sahel | 0-4 | Sorkh Poshan |

| 13 May 2024 | Attack Energy | 7-0 | Sarsabz Yashlar |

| 13 May 2024 | Aino Mina | 2-3 | Khurasan |

=== Round 9 ===
| 14 May 2024 | Wahidy | 2-5 | Istiqlal |

| 14 May 2024 | Abu Muslim | 3-2 | Khadim |

| 15 May 2024 | Adalat | 1-2 | Sorkh Poshan |

| 15 May 2024 | Maiwand | 3-5 | Sarsabz Yashlar |

| 16 May 2024 | Mawj Sahel | 2-0 | Khurasan |

| 16 May 2024 | Attack Energy | 2-0 | Aino Mina |

=== Round 10 ===
| 17 May 2024 | Abu Muslim | 6-2 | Istiqlal |

| 17 May 2024 | Khadim | 0-0 | Sorkh Poshan |

| 18 May 2024 | Wahidy | 0-4 | Sarsabz Yashlar |

| 18 May 2024 | Adalat | 3-2 | Khurasan |

| 19 May 2024 | Maiwand | 2-10 | Aino Mina |

| 19 May 2024 | Mawj Sahel | 0-4 | Attack Energy |

=== Round 11 ===
| 20 May 2024 | Sorkh Poshan | 2-1 | Abu Muslim |

| 20 May 2024 | Istiqlal | 1-0 | Sarsabz Yashlar |

| 21 May 2024 | Khadim | 2-1 | Khurasan |

| 21 May 2024 | Wahidy | 1-8 | Aino Mina |

| 22 May 2024 | Attack Energy | 2-0 | Adalat |

| 22 May 2024 | Mawj Sahel | 7-2 | Maiwand |

== League table ==
| Pos | Team | Pld | W | D | L | GF | GA | GD | Pts | Qualification or relegation |
|---|---|---|---|---|---|---|---|---|---|---|
| 1 | Attack Energy (C) | 11 | 11 | 0 | 0 | 41 | 0 | +41 | 33 | Qualification for 2024–25 AFC Challenge League Preliminary stage |
| 2 | Sorkh Poshan | 11 | 9 | 1 | 1 | 29 | 4 | +25 | 28 | |
| 3 | Abu Muslim | 11 | 8 | 1 | 2 | 38 | 13 | +25 | 25 | |
| 4 | Aino Mina | 11 | 6 | 0 | 5 | 33 | 16 | +17 | 18 | |
| 5 | Mawj Sahel | 11 | 5 | 1 | 5 | 17 | 18 | −1 | 16 | |
| 6 | Sarsabz Yashlar | 11 | 5 | 0 | 6 | 17 | 24 | −7 | 15 | |
| 7 | Istiqlal | 11 | 5 | 0 | 6 | 17 | 28 | −11 | 15 | |
| 8 | Khadim | 11 | 4 | 2 | 5 | 18 | 19 | −1 | 14 | |
| 9 | Khurasan | 11 | 4 | 0 | 7 | 12 | 25 | −13 | 12 | |
| 10 | Adalat | 11 | 3 | 2 | 6 | 17 | 17 | 0 | 11 | |
| 11 | Maiwand (R) | 11 | 2 | 0 | 9 | 16 | 50 | −34 | 6 | Relegation to Provincial Leagues |
| 12 | Wahidy (R) | 11 | 0 | 1 | 10 | 5 | 46 | −41 | 1 | Relegation to Provincial Leagues |

Source: RSSSF
Rules for classification: 1) Points; 2) Head-to-head points; 3) Head-to-head goal difference; 4) Goal difference; 5) Goals scored; 6) Draw
(C) Champions; (R) Relegated

== Awards ==
As of 31 May 2024

| Award | Recipient | Club |
|---|---|---|
| Top Scorer | Ahmad Nabi Muqdas | Aino Mina |
| Most Valuable Player | Hamid Amiri | Sorkh Poshan |
| Best Goalkeeper | Faisal Hamidi | Attack Energy |
| Best Young Player | Esmat Hadafmand | Mawj Sahel |
| Best Coach | Ali Ahmad Yarzadeh | Attack Energy |

== Attendances ==
| # | Football club | Average attendance |
|---|---|---|
| 1 | Attack Energy SC | 1,532 |
| 2 | Istiqlal FC | 584 |
| 3 | FC Sorkh Poshan | 420 |
| 4 | Abu Muslim FC | 333 |
| 5 | Aino Mina | 266 |
| 6 | Wahidy FC | 231 |
| 7 | Khurasan Faryab | 211 |
| 8 | Sarsabz Yashlar | 156 |
| 9 | Maiwand FC | 142 |
| 10 | Khadim FC | 134 |
| 11 | Adalat Farah | 121 |
| 12 | Mawj Sahel | 106 |
