= Mahboob Hanifi =

Afghan footballer

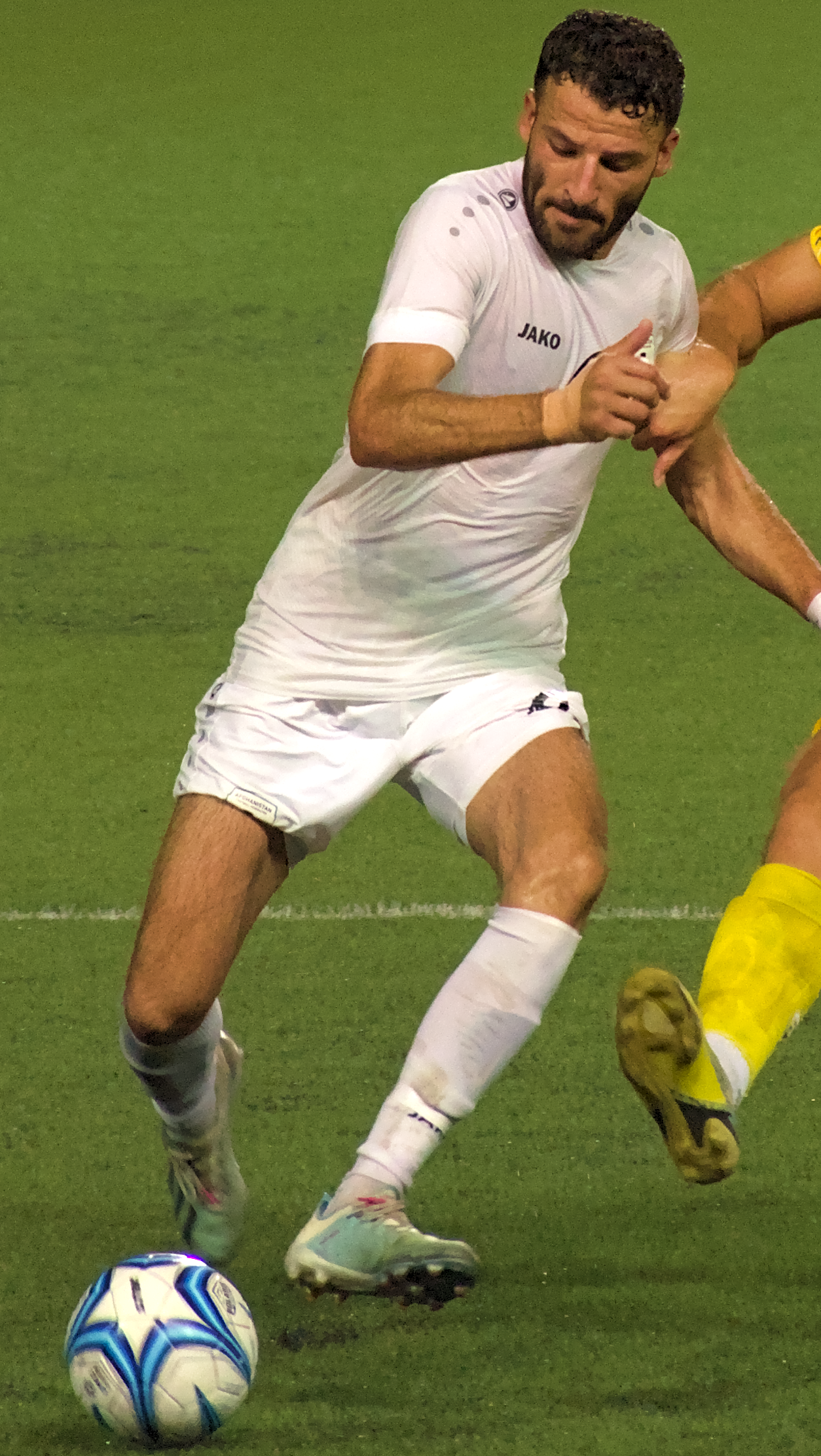
- Hanifi with Afghanistan in 2023

Personal information
- Full name: Mahboob Hanifi
- Date of birth: 22 March 1997 (age 29)
- Place of birth: Faryab, Afghanistan
- Height: 1.82 m (6 ft 0 in)
- Position: Centre-back

Team information
- Current team: Abu Muslim Farah
- Number: 5

Senior career*
Years	Team	Apps	(Gls)
2018–2021	Simorgh Alborz		
2021–2025	Attack Energy Herat		
2025–	Abu Muslim Farah		

International career^{‡}
2023–	Afghanistan	22	(1)
- * Club domestic league appearances and goals as of 2 June 2026 (UTC) ‡ National team caps and goals as of 2 June 2026 (UTC)

Mahboob Hanifi (Dari: محبوب حنیفی; born 22 March 1997) is an Afghan professional footballer who plays as a centre-back for Abu Muslim Farah in the Afghanistan Champions League.

== Club career ==
Hanifi began his senior career at Simorgh Alborz, representing the club in the Afghan Premier League from 2018 to 2021. In 2021, Hanifi joined Attack Energy Herat of the Afghanistan Champions League, based in Herat. He established himself as one of the most consistent defenders in Afghan domestic football during his time at the club. Attack Energy won the Afghanistan Champions League title in 2022, finishing the season unbeaten without conceding a goal across all 11 matches. The club subsequently won the title again in 2024 and represented Afghanistan in continental competition, qualifying for the inaugural 2024–25 AFC Challenge League.

On 19 January 2025, Attack Energy announced their dissolution following allegations of match-fixing in the Afghanistan Champions League. Hanifi subsequently joined Abu Muslim Farah.

== International career ==
Hanifi made his senior debut for the Afghanistan national team in 2023, going on to become a key figure in Afghan defence. He has earned 22 caps and scored one international goal, representing Afghanistan in the FIFA World Cup 2026 qualifying campaign, the CAFA Nations Cup in 2023 and 2025, and the AFC Asian Cup 2027 qualifying campaign. His sole international goal came against Pakistan on 14 October 2025 in an AFC Asian Cup qualifying match.

== Honours ==
Attack Energy

- Afghanistan Champions League: 2022, 2024
