= Moshtagh Yaghoubi =

Finnish footballer (born 1994)

Moshtagh Yaghoubi مشتاق یغوبی
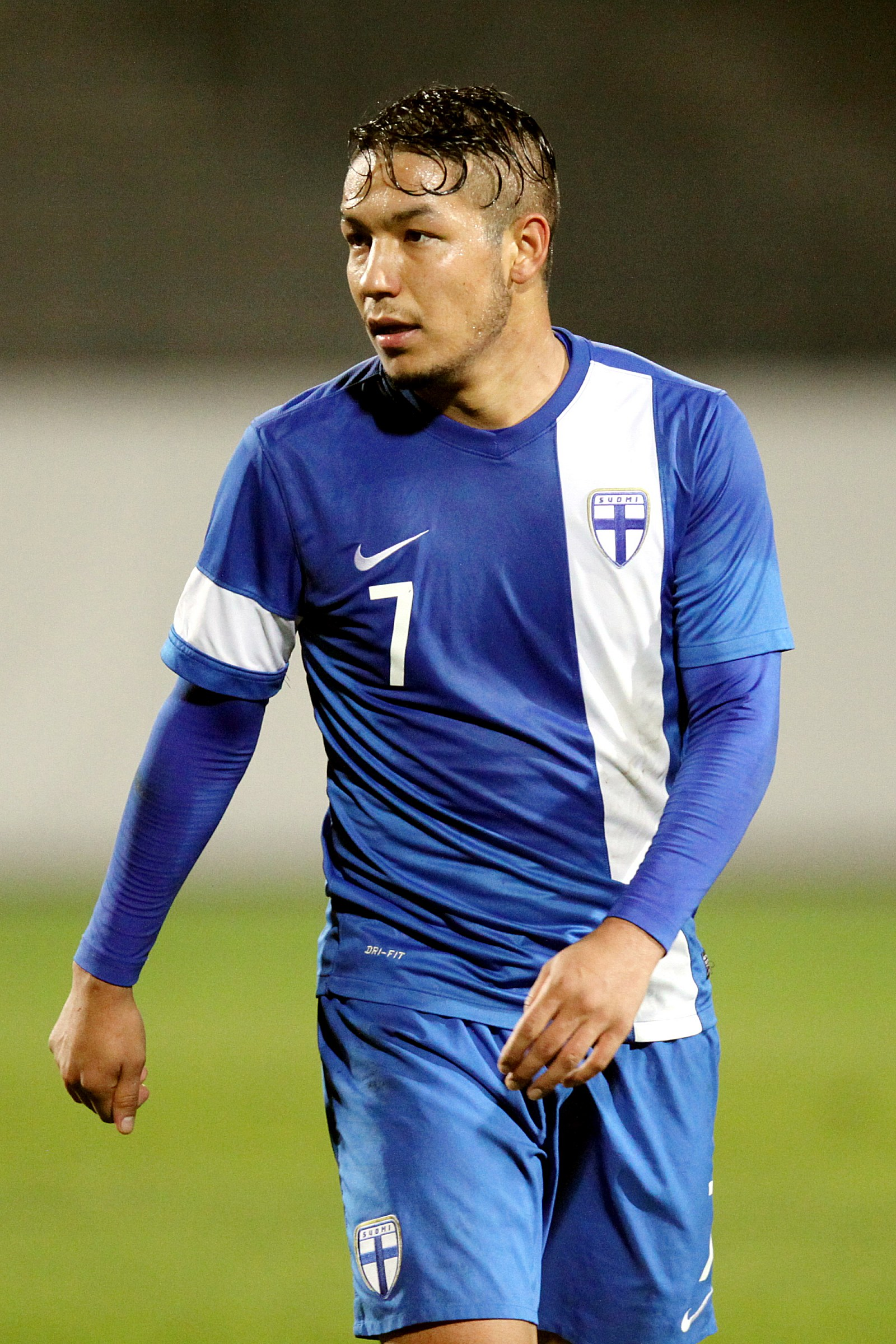
- Yaghoubi with Finland U21 in 2015

Personal information
- Full name: Moshtagh Hossain Yaghoubi
- Date of birth: 8 November 1994 (age 32)
- Place of birth: Kabul, Afghanistan
- Height: 1.78 m (5 ft 10 in)
- Position: Midfielder

Team information
- Current team: Abu Muslim
- Number: 10

Youth career
- 2007: HaPa
- 2008: MP
- 2009: HJK
- 2010: PK-35

Senior career*
Years	Team	Apps	(Gls)
2011–2014	Honka	52	(4)
2011–2012	→ Pallohonka (loan)	22	(2)
2014	Spartaks Jūrmala	6	(1)
2014	→ Dynamo Moscow (loan)	0	(0)
2015	RoPS	26	(4)
2016	Spartaks Jūrmala	6	(0)
2016	→ Shakhter Karagandy (loan)	11	(0)
2017–2018	HJK	38	(4)
2019	SJK	15	(1)
2020–2021	HIFK	40	(4)
2022	AC Oulu	6	(0)
2022	→ SJK (loan)	8	(0)
2023	PK-35	12	(0)
2024	Kingston City	5	(0)
2025	Attack Energy		
2025	HIFK	14	(1)
2025–	Abu Muslim		

International career^{‡}
2009	Finland U15	4	(0)
2013	Finland U19	1	(0)
2013–2014	Finland U20	5	(1)
2013–2016	Finland U21	22	(6)
2017–2019	Finland	7	(1)
- * Club domestic league appearances and goals as of 4 October 2025 ‡ National team caps and goals as of 22:57, 16 May 2019 (UTC)

Moshtagh Hossain Yaghoubi (Finnish pronunciation: [ˈmoʃtɑg ˈjɑgubi]; Dari: مشتاق حسین یعقوبی) aka Mosa (born 8 November 1994) is a professional footballer who plays as a midfielder for Afghanistan Champions League club Abu Muslim. Born in Afghanistan, he represents the Finland national team.

== Early life ==
Moshtagh Yaghoubi was born on 8 November 1994 to an ethnic Hazara family in Kabul, Afghanistan.

== Youth career ==
Yaghoubi grew up in Finland and started playing football at the age of 13 with his local club HaPa. After playing in the youth teams of MP, HJK and PK-35 he joined Honka in 2011.

== Club career ==
=== Honka ===
Yaghoubi made his debut for Honka against KuPS on 13 October 2011. Yaghoubi scored his first goal on 27 May 2012 against FC Haka. Yaghoubi made his Europa League debut on 18 July 2013 in the 2013–14 UEFA Europa League second qualifying round where Honka lost 1–3 in the first leg to 2012–13 Ekstraklasa runners up Lech Poznań.

=== Pallohonka ===
Yaghoubi played 1 season on loan for the second team of FC Honka. He played 22 games and scored 2 goals. After his loan he returned to FC Honka.

=== Spartaks Jūrmala ===
In February 2014 Yaghoubi was transferred to the Latvian Higher League club FK Spartaks Jūrmala, signing a three-year contract. He was given shirtnumber 7.

=== Dynamo Moscow ===
Soon after his move to Spartaks Jūrmala he immediately was loaned to the Russian Premier League side Dynamo Moscow. Yaghoubi was given shirt number 61 in the first team, but did not make any appearances for them, mostly remaining on the bench and being involved in the reserve team action.

=== Return to Spartaks Jūrmala ===
In August 2014 he returned to Spartaks Jūrmala. Yaghoubi scored his first Latvian Higher League goal on 26 October 2014 in a 1–0 victory over FK Daugava Rīga.

=== RoPS ===
On 5 March 2015 he signed a contract with RoPS which is a football team in the Finland Veikkausliiga. He made his debut against SJK on 17 March 2015. He scored his first goal against FC Inter Turku in the Suomen Cup. He ended the season with a second place in the Finnish league. He scored 4 goals and made 5 assists. He won at the end of the season the Best Midfielder award for his club and the Best Midfielder award for the Finland U21.

=== Shakhter Karagandy ===
In February 2016, Yaghoubi went on trial with Kazakhstan Premier League side FC Shakhter Karagandy. On 17 March 2016, Yaghoubi signed a season-long loan deal with Shakhter Karagandy. Yaghoubi's loan was terminated by Shakhter Karagandy on 17 June 2016.

=== HJK Helsinki ===
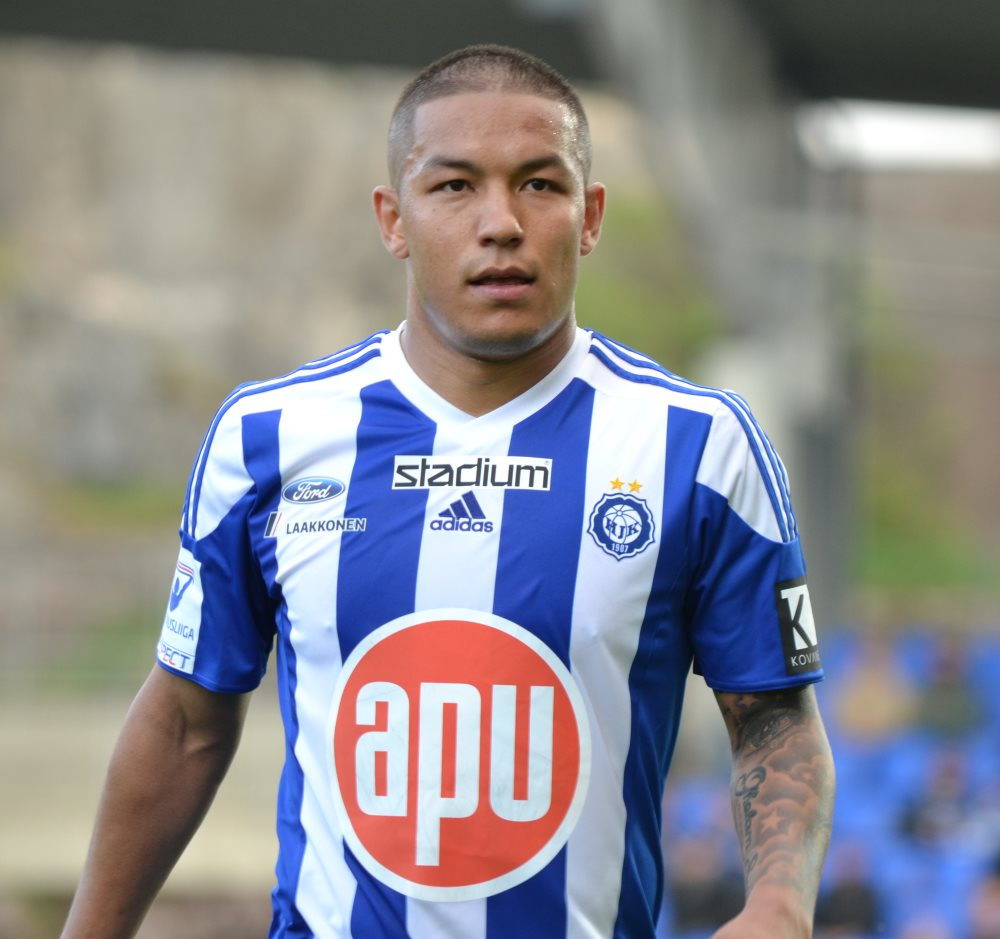
Yaghoubi with HJK in 2017

On 4 November 2016, HJK Helsinki announced the signing of Yaghoubi.

=== SJK Seinäjoki ===
On 31 January 2019, SJK announced the signing of Yaghoubi.

=== HIFK ===
After a season at SJK, it was announced on 29 November 2019, that Yaghoubi would join HIFK from 2020, signing a deal until the end of 2021 with the club. He got shirt number 7.

=== AC Oulu ===
On 18 December 2021, he joined AC Oulu on a two-year contract. In the summer of 2022 Yaghoubi returned to SJK on loan. Upon the completion of the loan, his contract with AC Oulu was terminated by mutual consent on 14 November 2022.

After playing for PK-35 in Finland and Kingston City FC in Australia, Yaghoubi signed with Attack Energy SC in Afghanistan Champions League and returned to his country of birth.

== International career ==
=== Finland U21 ===
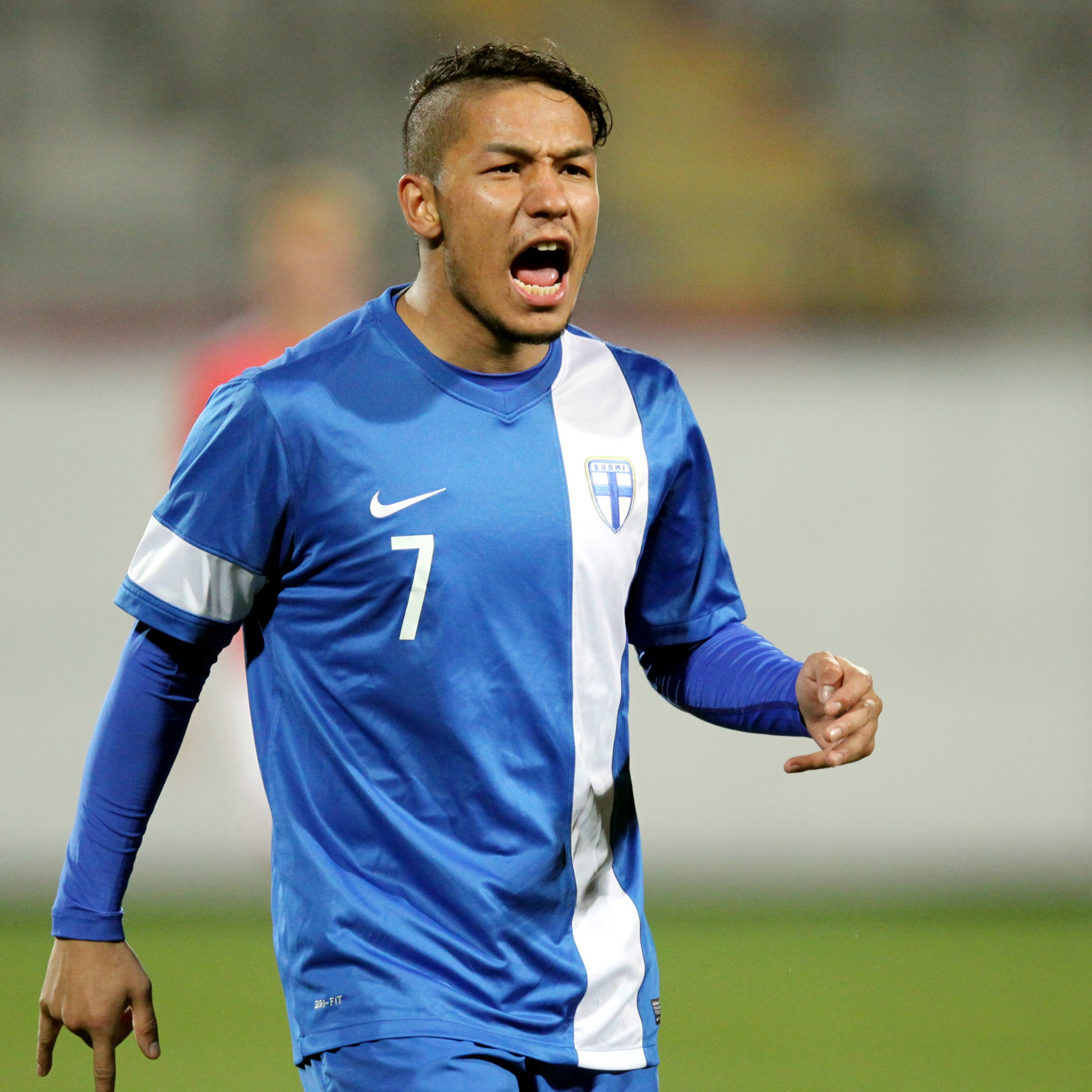
Yaghoubi with Finland U21 in 2015

Yaghoubi acquired Finnish nationality in 2013 and got called up for Finland national under-21 team for 2015 UEFA European Under-21 Football Championship qualification match against Lithuania on 11 June 2013. Yaghoubi scored his national team debut goal when Finland beat Wales U-21 5–1 in UEFA Under-21 Championship qualification on 14 August 2013.

=== Finland ===
On 31 October 2013 Yaghoubi made his debut for Finland national football team in an unofficial 4–2 friendly match loss to Mexico. He eventually made his official debut for Finland in a 2018 FIFA World Cup qualification match against Turkey. He came on the field in the 67th minute for Sakari Mattila.

== Career statistics ==
=== Club ===
As of 31 December 2023

Appearances and goals by club, season and competition
Club	Season	League			National Cup		League Cup		Continental		Total	
Club	Season	Division	Apps	Goals	Apps	Goals	Apps	Goals	Apps	Goals	Apps	Goals
Honka	2011	Veikkausliiga	1	0	0	0	0	0	–		1	0
Honka	2012	Veikkausliiga	27	1	4	0	6	0	–		37	1
Honka	2013	Veikkausliiga	24	3	2	0	4	0	2 (Note: Appearances and goals in the UEFA Europa League)	0	32	3
Honka	Total		52	4	6	0	10	0	2	0	70	4
Pallohonka (loan)	2011	Kakkonen	20	2	–		–		–		20	2
Pallohonka (loan)	2012	Kakkonen	2	0	–		–		–		2	0
Pallohonka (loan)	Total		22	2	–	–	–	–	–	–	22	2
Spartaks Jūrmala	2014	Virslīga	6	1	0	0	—		—		6	1
Dynamo Moscow (loan)	2013–14	Russian Premier League	0	0	0	0	—		—		0	0
RoPS	2015	Veikkausliiga	30	4	1	1	2	0	—		33	5
Spartaks Jūrmala	2016	Virslīga	6	0	0	0	—		2	0	8	0
Shakhter Karagandy (loan)	2016	Kazakhstan Premier League	11	0	1	0	–		—		12	0
HJK	2017	Veikkausliiga	16	2	4	2	–		3	1	23	5
HJK	2018	Veikkausliiga	22	2	9	5	-		5 (Note: One appearance in the UEFA Champions League, and four appearances and two goals in the UEFA Europa League)	2	36	9
HJK	Total		38	4	13	7	–	–	8	3	59	14
SJK	2018	Veikkausliiga	15	1	3	0	—		—		18	1
HIFK	2020	Veikkausliiga	17	1	1	0	–		–		18	1
HIFK	2021	Veikkausliiga	23	3	4	0	–		–		27	3
HIFK	Total		40	4	5	0	–	–	–	–	45	4
AC Oulu	2022	Veikkausliiga	6	0	2	0	3	1	–		11	1
SJK (loan)	2022	Veikkausliiga	8	0	–		–		–		8	0
PK-35	2023	Kakkonen	12	0	–		–		–		12	0
Kingston City	2024	Victorian Premier League	5	0	–		–		–		5	0
Attack Energy	2025	Afghanistan Champions League			–		–		–			
HIFK	2025	Kolmonen	0	0	0	0	–		–		0	0
Career total			251	20	31	8	15	1	12	3	309	33

=== International ===
As of match played 9 June 2018

Appearances and goals by national team and year
National team	Year	Apps	Goals
Finland	2013	1	0
Finland	2014	0	0
Finland	2015	0	0
Finland	2016	0	0
Finland	2017	3	0
Finland	2018	3	1
Total		7	1

Scores and results list Finland's goal tally first, score column indicates score after each Finland goal.

List of international goals scored by Moshtagh Yaghoubi
No.	Date	Venue	Opponent	Score	Result	Competition	Ref.
1	9 June 2018	Tampere Stadium, Tampere, Finland	Belarus	2–0	2–0	Friendly	

== Honours ==
Individual

- Veikkausliiga Midfielder of the Year: 2015

== Personal life ==
Yaghoubi was born in Kabul, Afghanistan, to ethnic Hazara parents. Yaghoubi and his family fled Afghanistan in 1999 to settle down in Tehran, Iran. After living seven years in Iran his family applied for asylum in Finland.

Yaghoubi has a tattoo on his left arm with the name of his late father Gholam Sakhi.
