= Siar Sadat =

Afghan footballer

Personal information
- Date of birth: 21 August 2003 (age 23)
- Place of birth: Quebec City, Canada
- Height: 1.70 m (5 ft 7 in)
- Position: Midfielder

Team information
- Current team: Abu Muslim FC
- Number: 2

Senior career*
Years	Team	Apps	(Gls)
2023–2024	FC Laval		
2024	Blainville		

International career^{‡}
2024–	Afghanistan	1	(0)
- * Club domestic league appearances and goals ‡ National team caps and goals as of 26 March 2024

Siar Sadat (born 21 August 2003) is a professional footballer who plays as a midfielder for Abu Muslim FC. Born in Canada, he represents the Afghanistan national team.

== International career ==
Sadat made his debut for the senior Afghanistan national team on 26 March 2024 in a World Cup qualifier against India.
