= Ayno Maina Dam =

Check dam in Kandahar, Afghanistan

Coordinates: 31°40′59″N 65°47′59″E

- Location within Afghanistan
- Location: Ayno Maina, Kandahar, Afghanistan
- Purpose: Irrigation

Dam and spillways
- Type of dam: Embankment
- Length: 330 m (1,080 ft)
- Width (base): 53 m (174 ft)

The Ayno Maina Dam is located north of Ayno Maina and west of Daman District in Kandahar, Afghanistan. It is a recently built embankment dam for the purpose of providing irrigation water to Ayno Maina. The check dam traps rain water in its reservoir, which is mainly used for watering plants in Ayno Maina.

The storage of water in Ayno Maina decreases flooding and other environmental issues while at the same time increases wildlife and underground water level of the nearby area, and attracts more tourists to visit Ayno Maina.

== See also ==
- List of dams and reservoirs in Afghanistan
- Environmental issues in Afghanistan
- Tourism in Afghanistan
- Wildlife of Afghanistan
