= Nikolay Davydov (footballer) =

Irish footballer (born 1968)

Personal information
- Full name: Nikolay Vladimirovich Davydov
- Date of birth: 5 April 1998 (age 28)
- Place of birth: Hannover, Germany
- Positions: Midfielder; winger

Team information
- Current team: FC Bars Issyk-Kul
- Number: 17

Senior career*
Years	Team	Apps	(Gls)
–2017	FC Ismaning II	3	(0)
2017–2019	TSV Buchbach	4	(0)
2017–2019	→ TSV Buchbach II (loan)	33	(15)
2019–2021	SC Eintracht Freising	24	(9)
2021	VfR Garching	7	(0)
2021–2022	SC Eintracht Freising	19	(0)
2022–2023	FC Ismaning	19	(2)
2023–2024	TSV Wartenberg	15	(13)

International career
2023–	Kyrgyzstan		
- * Club domestic league appearances and goals

Nikolay Vladimirovich Davydov (Russian: Николай Владимирович Давыдов; born 5 April 1998) is a professional footballer who plays as a midfielder or winger for FC Bars Issyk-Kul. Born in Germany, he is a Kyrgyzstan international.

== Early life ==
Davydov was born in 1998 in Germany. He is a native of Hanover, Germany.

== Career ==
Davydov started his career with German side FC Ismaning II. In 2017, he signed for German side TSV Buchbach. In 2019, he signed for German side SC Eintracht Freising. In 2021, he signed for German side VfR Garching. In 2021, he returned to German side SC Eintracht Freising. In 2022, he signed for German side FC Ismaning. In 2023, he signed for German side TSV Wartenberg.

== Style of play ==
Davydov mainly operated as a midfielder or winger. He operated as a left attacking midfielder while playing for German side SC Eintracht Freising.

== Personal life ==
Davydov is the son of Kyrgyzstani skier Vladimir Davydov. He obtained a Kyrgyzstani passport in 2021.
