= Ovays Azizi =

Afghan footballer (born 1992)

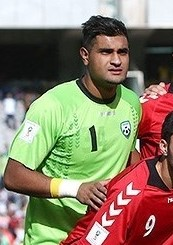

Personal information
- Full name: Ovays Azizi
- Date of birth: 29 January 1992 (age 34)
- Place of birth: Herat, Afghanistan
- Height: 1.90 m (6 ft 3 in)
- Position: Goalkeeper

Team information
- Current team: Abu Muslim
- Number: 1

Youth career
- AB

Senior career*
Years	Team	Apps	(Gls)
- Allerød
2013–2014	Gladsaxe-Hero		
2014–2016	Skjold Birkerød		
2016–2017	Avarta		
2017	B.1908		
2017–2018	Skjold Birkerød		
2018–2019	Kastrup		
2019–2020	Maziya	4	(0)
2020–2021	Ariana	28	(0)
2022	Rosengård	15	(0)
2023–2024	Hillerød	6	(0)
2024	Ariana	13	(0)
2025–	Abu Muslim		

International career
2015–	Afghanistan	49	(0)
- * Club domestic league appearances and goals

Ovays Azizi (Dari: اویس عزیزي; born 29 January 1992) is an Afghan professional footballer who plays as a goalkeeper for Abu Muslim and the Afghanistan national team.

== International career ==
Azizi made his debut for the Afghanistan national team in a 2–0 friendly loss to Thailand on 3 September 2015.

== Personal life ==
Azizi was born in Afghanistan and lost his father and grandparents in the Afghan Civil War. His grandmother, mother and his 4 siblings fled Afghanistan and took refuge in Iran. In 2001, he was accepted as a refugee in Denmark. Azizi also worked in occupational therapy in Denmark.

He plays for the Danish side, Hillerod. Playing for Maziya football team, he was named as the best goalkeeper of the Dhivehi Premier League (DPL) for the 2019-2020 season.
