= Zelfy Nazary =

Afghan footballer

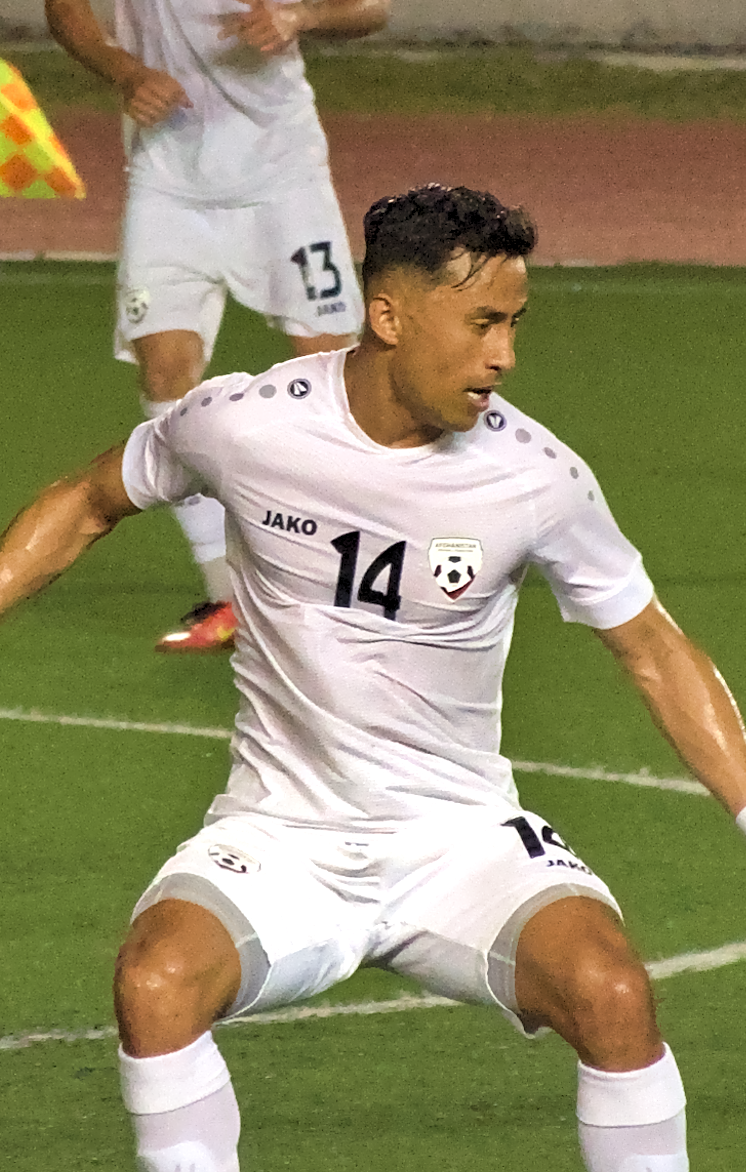
- Nazary with Afghanistan in 2023

Personal information
- Full name: Zelfy Nazary
- Date of birth: 1 January 1995 (age 31)
- Place of birth: Jaghori, Afghanistan
- Height: 1.70 m (5 ft 7 in)
- Position: Midfielder

Team information
- Current team: Abu Muslim

Youth career
- Balcatta FC

Senior career*
Years	Team	Apps	(Gls)
2015–2017	Balcatta FC	26	(7)
2017–2018	Floreat Athena	25	(2)
2018–2019	Olympic FC	37	(5)
2019	Western Pride	11	(5)
2020–2021	Dandenong Thunder	11	(0)
2021	St Albans Saints	21	(0)
2024–25	Abu Muslim		
2024–25	Buleen Lions		
2025–	Abu Muslim		

International career^{‡}
2018–	Afghanistan	15	(1)
- * Club domestic league appearances and goals as of 22 January 2026 ‡ National team caps and goals as of 26 March 2024

Zelfagar "Zelfy" Nazary (Dari: ذوالفقار نظری; born 1 January 1995) is an Afghan professional footballer who plays for Abu Muslim and the Afghanistan national team.

== Early life ==
Nazary moved to Australia with his family where he lived in Katanning, Western Australia and played for clubs in Albany, Western Australia.

== Club career ==
Nazary played in the National Premier Leagues Western Australia over four seasons with Balcatta FC and Floreat Athena.

In 2018, Nazary moved to Queensland where he helped Olympic FC reach the National Premier Leagues Queensland Grand Final and FFA Cup round of 32.

Nazary joined league rivals Western Pride in June 2019.

== International career ==
Nazary made his international debut for Afghanistan against Palestine in August 2018. He won his second cap against Tajikistan, coming on as a substitute in a 1–1 draw in June 2019.

=== International goals ===
Scores and results list Afghanistan's goal tally first.

No.	Date	Venue	Opponent	Score	Result	Competition
1.	14 November 2019	Pamir Stadium, Dushanbe, Tajikistan	India	1–0	1–1	2022 FIFA World Cup qualification
