= Stefan Haas =

German footballer (born 1994)

Personal information
- Date of birth: 29 June 1994 (age 32)
- Place of birth: Moosburg, Germany
- Height: 1.87 m (6 ft 2 in)
- Position: Midfielder

Youth career
- –2011: SE Freising
- 2011–2013: SpVgg Unterhaching

Senior career*
Years	Team	Apps	(Gls)
2012–2015	SpVgg Unterhaching II	19	(5)
2013–2015	SpVgg Unterhaching	19	(0)
2015–2016	Fortuna Unterhaching		
2016	Mirandela	8	(1)
2017–2018	Almancilense		
2019–2020	Leixões	0	(0)
2020–	VfR Garching	1	(0)
- * Club domestic league appearances and goals as of 13:47, 9 April 2022 (UTC)

Stefan Haas (born 29 June 1994) is a German professional footballer who plays as a midfielder.

== Career ==
Until 2011, Haas played in the youth of SE Freising. For the 2011–12 season he moved to SpVgg Unterhaching, where he played in the youth team. In the 2012–13 season Haas received a professional contract that ran until 2015, but continued to play only in the U-19s and in the second team in the fifth-rate Bayernliga.

On 27 July 2013, Haas played his first professional game as a substitute against Chemnitzer FC. He made his starting eleven debut on 31 August 2013 (6th matchday) in a 3–1 home win against 1. FC Saarbrücken.

After spells in Portugal with Mirandela, Almancilense and Leixões, Haas returned to Germany in the beginning of 2020, when he signed with VfR Garching.

== Personal life ==
Stefan Haas is the younger brother of Maximilian Haas, who also was a professional soccer player and used to play for the second team of FC Bayern Munich, the English club Middlesbrough and the Portuguese club Sporting Braga.
