= Khurasan FC =

Football club in Faryab, Afghanistan

Khurasan
- Full name: Khurasan Faryab Football Club
- Founded: 1997; 29 years ago
- Chairman: Mohammad Aref Moulani
- Manager: Omid Nasib
- League: Afghanistan Champions League
- 2024–25: Afghanistan Champions League, 6th of 12

Khurasan Football Club (Dari: خراسان فاریاب, romanized: Bâšgâh-e Futbâl-e Khurâsân), (also written as Khorasan FC); is a professional football club based in the Faryab Province of Afghanistan. It currently plays in the Afghanistan Football Champions League. The head coach of this club is Omid Nasib, a former national player of Afghanistan.

== History ==
The club was established in 1997 in Maymana, in the Faryab Province of northwestern Afghanistan.

In 2021, team featured in the inaugural edition of Afghanistan Champions League.

In the 2022 season, the club escaped the relegation finishing tenth by a single point in the twelve team league.

In 2024, the club terminated the campaign finishing ninth. The team achieved four victories in the season against Maiwand, Wahidy, Istiqlal, and Aino Mina.

The next season at the top tier, the team finished sixth.

== Domestic history ==
Key

Champion Runners-up 3rd place

Season	League							Cup	Notes
Season	Div.	Pos.	Pl.	W	D	L	Pts.	Cup	Notes
2022	I	10th	11	2	2	7	8		
2023	I	Not held							
2024	I	9th	11	4	0	7	12		
