= Amanullah Sardari =

Afghan footballer, defender

Personal information
- Date of birth: 22 August 2000 (age 26)
- Place of birth: Parwan, Afghanistan
- Height: 1.75 m (5 ft 9 in)
- Position: Center-back

Team information
- Current team: Abu Muslim
- Number: 44

Senior career*
| Years | Team | Apps | (Gls) |
| 2016 | De Spin Ghar Bazan | | |
| 2016–2020 | Shaheen Asmayee | | |
| 2021– | Abu Muslim | | |

International career
| 2017– | Afghanistan | 7 | (0) |
- * Club domestic league appearances and goals

Amanullah Sardari (born 22 August 2000) is an Afghan professional footballer who plays for Abu Muslim and the Afghanistan national football team.

== Club career ==
Sardari played for Shaheen Asmayee from 2016 until 2020.

In 2021, Sardari moved to Abu Muslim.

== International career ==
Sardari made his senior international debut on 10 October 2017 in a 3–3 draw with Jordan in AFC Asian Cup qualification.

== Honors ==
Shaheen Asmayee

- Afghan Premier League: 2017
- Afghan Premier League runner-up: 2018

Abu Muslim

- Afghanistan Champions League runner-up: 2022
