= Wildlife of Afghanistan =

Afghanistan has long been known for diverse wildlife. Many of the larger mammals in the country are categorized by the International Union for Conservation of Nature as globally threatened. These include the snow leopard, Marco Polo sheep, Siberian musk deer, markhor, urial, and the Asiatic black bear. Other species of interest are the ibex, the gray wolf, and the brown bear, striped hyena, and numerous bird of prey species. Most of the Marco Polo sheep and ibex have been poached for food, whereas wolves, snow leopards and bears are being killed for damage prevention.

The long-lasting conflict in the country badly affected both predator and prey species, so that the national population is considered to be small and severely threatened.

Contemporary records do not exist for any of the smaller cat species known to have been present in the country, all of which were threatened already in the 1970s by indiscriminate hunting, prey depletion and habitat destruction. Hunting wildlife is banned in all provinces of Afghanistan.

== Mammals ==
A leopard was recorded by a camera trap in Bamyan Province in 2011. Between 2004 and 2007, a total of 85 leopard skins were seen being offered in markets of Kabul. A snow leopard was sighted in Badakhshan in 2024.

== Extinct wildlife ==
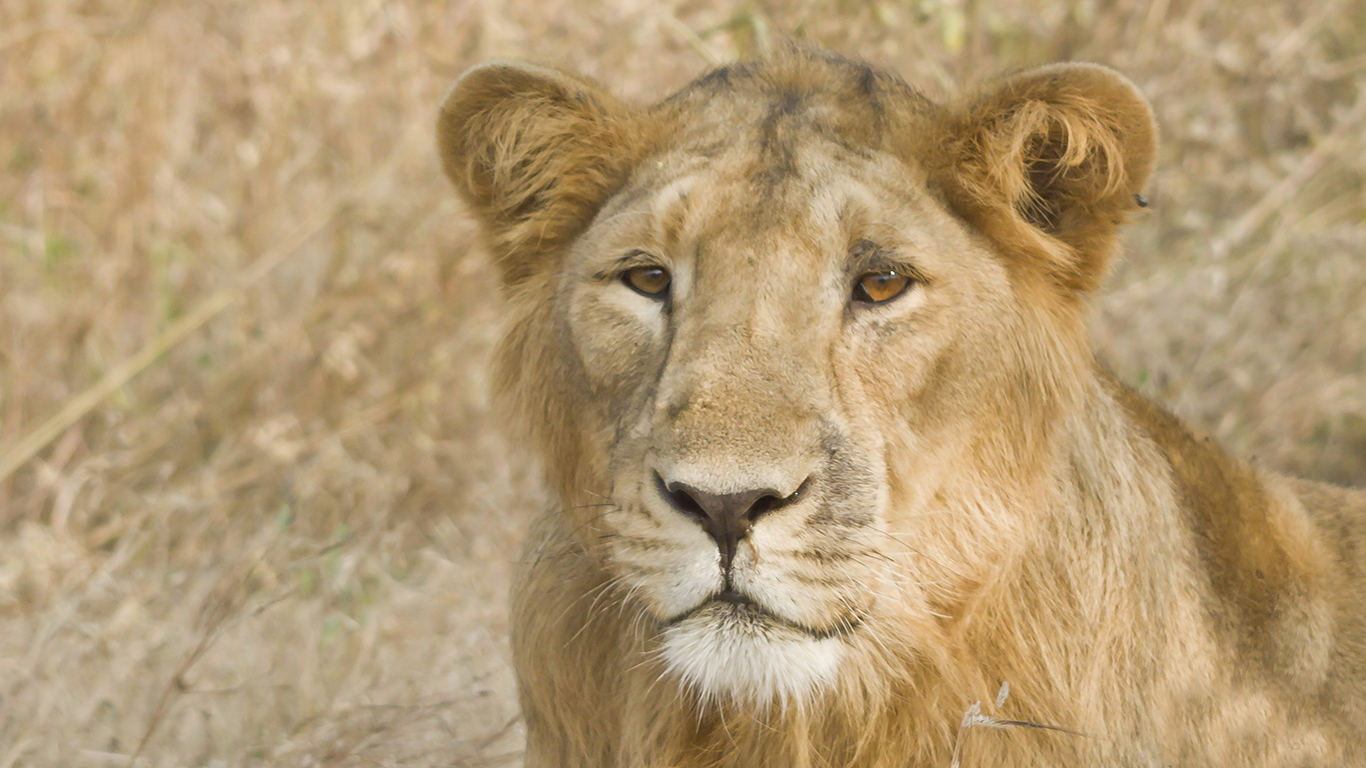
A sub-adult Asiatic lion in Gir Forest, India

The Asiatic cheetah is considered to be extirpated in Afghanistan since the 1950s. Two cheetah skins were seen in markets in the country, one in 1971, and then in 2006. The latter was reportedly from Samangan Province.

The Caspian tiger used to occur along the upper reaches of Hari River near Herat to the jungles in the lower reaches of the river until the early 1970s.

Uncertain is the historical presence of the Asiatic lion in the country, as locality records are not known. It is thought to have been present in southwestern and southern Afghanistan. In March 2017, the Afghan Border Police seized six white lions at the Wesh–Chaman border crossing in Spin Boldak. The origin of the lions was unclear at first but later it was confirmed that they were from Africa. Four of the lions were later taken to Kabul Zoo while the other two were still somewhere in Kandahar Province.

== See also ==
- Geography of Afghanistan
- List of protected areas of Afghanistan
