= Ayno Maina =

Planned town near Kandahar, Afghanistan

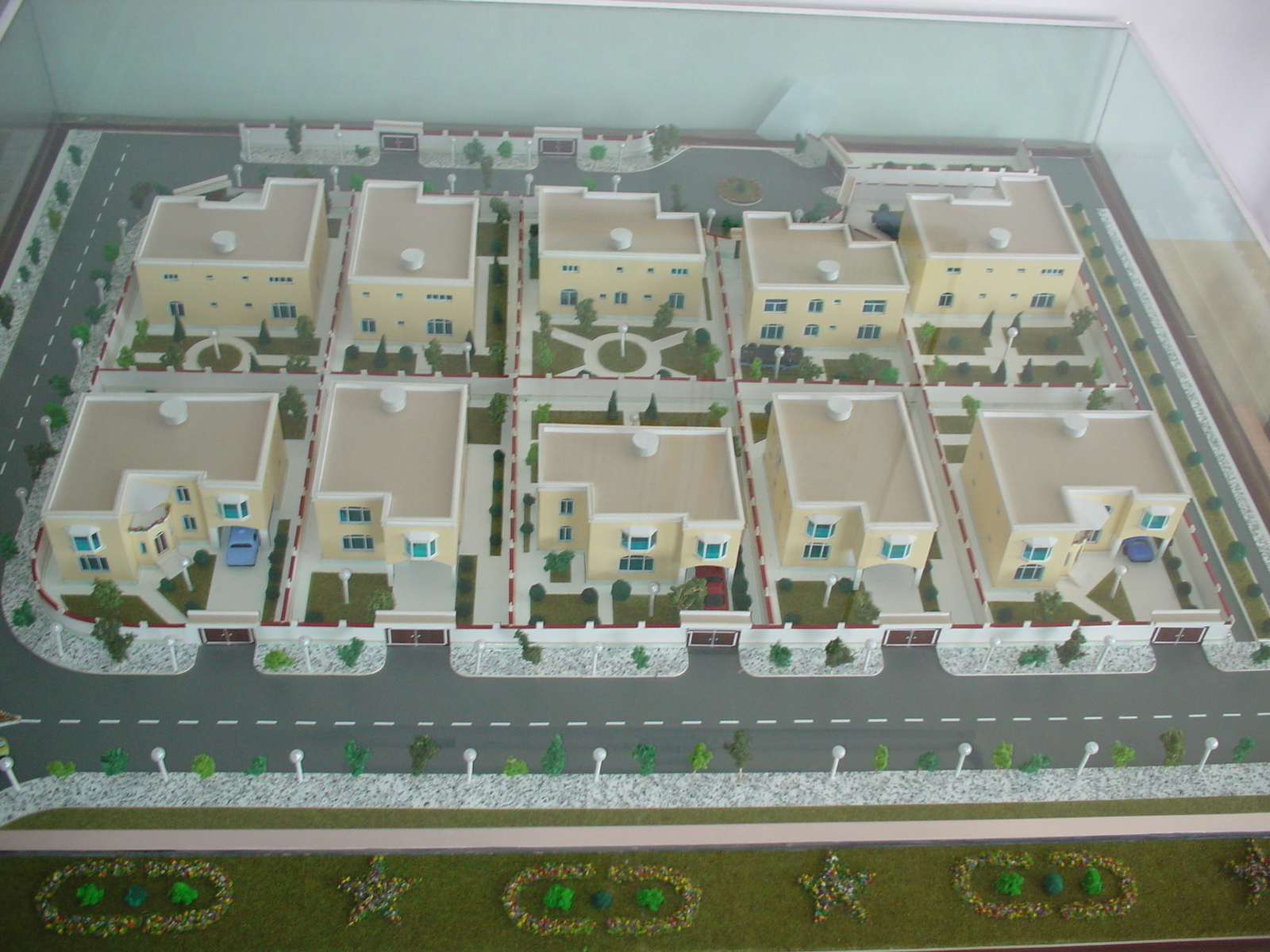
The original miniature of the Ayno Maina planned community project, which began in 2003 by Mahmud Karzai and associates

Ayno Maina, also written as Aino Maina (Dari: عینو مینه; Pashto: عینو مینه), is a planned gated community in the northeastern section of Kandahar, Afghanistan. The housing development project began in 2003 with the aim of building over 20,000 family homes. It became a "leading example of reconstruction and development in Afghanistan." The community has various types of houses and apartments for the working class, the middle class, and the elites. The Ayno Maina Dam is located in the northern part, which provides water for irrigation purposes.

Ayno Maina has a number of companies, business centers, supermarkets, banks, hotels, restaurants, mosques, hospitals, universities, parks, and places to play sports or just relax. Many tourists visit the gated community for leisure and pleasure purposes.

== History ==
The Ayno Maina development project began in 2003 by a group of Afghan Americans, with a $3 million dollar grant from the U.S. Overseas Private Investment Corporation. The construction framework and design credits go to AFCO International, a company based in Virginia, United States, and owned by Mahmud Karzai and associates.

In 2011 the project won both the "Residential Project of the Year" and the "Sustainable Project of the Year" at the Middle East Architect Awards, which was held at the Jumeirah Zabeel Saray in Dubai, United Arab Emirates. By 2016 Aino Maina had around 4,000 families living in it.

== See also ==
- Tourism in Afghanistan
