= 2022 Afghanistan Champions League =

Afghanistan Champions League
- Season: 2022
- Dates: 6 November 2022 – 9 December 2022
- Champions: Attack Energy
- Relegated: Azadi Club; Atalan Club
- Matches: 66
- Goals: 312 (4.73 per match)

The 2022 Afghanistan Champions League was the second season of Afghanistan Champions League, the Afghan league for association football clubs, since its establishment in 2021. The season began on 6 November 2022 and ended on 9 December 2022. Attack Energy head into the season as the champions. Azadi Club and Atalan Club were relegated into the end of the season.

== Teams ==
The following 12 clubs competed in the 2022 Afghanistan Champions League season.

Club	Location
Attack Energy SC	Herat
Abu Muslim FC	Farah
MGM Khadim	Sar-e Pol
Aino Mina FC	Kandahar
Mawj Sahel FC	Balkh
Maiwand FC	Helmand
FC Sorkh Poshan	Herat
Istiqlal FC	Kabul
Wahidy FC	Paktia
Khurasan FC	Faryab
Azadi Club	Ghazni
Atalan Club	Khost

== Season summary ==
In the second 2022 season, Abu Muslim club came second after Attack Energy by 4 points. The two of 12 clubs finished without any defeat. During the Champions League games, the teams of Attack Energy and Abu Muslim played against each other, and this match ended with a result of 1–1.

== League table ==
Pos	Team	Pld	W	D	L	GF	GA	GD	Pts	Qualification or relegation
1	Attack Energy (C)	11	10	1	0	36	6	+30	31	
2	Abu Muslim	11	8	3	0	35	13	+22	27	
3	MGM Khadim	11	7	2	2	36	18	+18	23	
4	Aino Mina	11	6	0	5	23	17	+6	18	
5	Mawj Sahel	11	5	2	4	31	22	+9	17	
6	Maiwand (Note: Maiwand FC competed as Esmat Laghmani in the previous season.)	11	5	2	4	28	21	+7	17	
7	Sorkh Poshan	11	3	3	5	17	14	+3	12	
8	Istiqlal	11	3	3	5	27	26	+1	12	
9	Wahidy	11	3	2	6	24	45	−21	11	
10	Khurasan	11	2	2	7	13	35	−22	8	
11	Azadi Club (R)	11	2	1	8	24	47	−23	7	Relegated
12	Atalan Club (R)	11	1	1	9	17	47	−30	4	Relegated

Source: RSSSF
Rules for classification: 1) points; 2) head-to-head points; 3) head-to-head goal difference; 4) goal difference; 5) number of goals scored; 6) drawing of lots
(C) Champions; (R) Relegated

== Results ==
=== Round 1 ===
6 November 2022	Istiqlal	0–5	Attack Energy
		Report

7 November 2022	MGM Khadim	3–1	Mawj Sahel
		Report

8 November 2022	Atalan Club	2–4	Wahidy
		Report

8 November 2022	Azadi Club	3–1	Maiwand
		Report

9 November 2022	Abu Muslim	4–2	Aino Mina
		Report

9 November 2022	Khurasan	2–1	Sorkh Poshan
		Report

=== Round 2 ===
10 November 2022	Istiqlal	2–3	Mawj Sahel
		Report

10 November 2022	Attack Energy	5–1	Wahidy
		Report

11 November 2022	MGM Khadim	4–2	Maiwand
		Report

11 November 2022	Aino Mina	2–1	Atalan Club
		Report

12 November 2022	Sorkh Poshan	3–0	Azadi Club
		Report

12 November 2022	Khurasan	0–0	Abu Muslim
		Report

=== Round 3 ===
13 November 2022	Istiqlal	1–1	Wahidy
		Report

13 November 2022	Mawj Sahel	2–2	Maiwand
		Report

14 November 2022	Attack Energy	2–0	Aino Mina
		Report

14 November 2022	MGM Khadim	3–1	Sorkh Poshan
		Report

15 November 2022	Khurasan	1–0	Atalan
		Report

15 November 2022	Azadi	2–5	Abu Muslim
		Report

=== Round 4 ===
16 November 2022	Istiqlal	1–2	Maiwand
		Report

16 November 2022	Wahidy	2–1	Aino Mina
		Report

17 November 2022	Sorkh Poshan	2–2	Mawj Sahel
		Report

17 November 2022	Attack Energy	6–0	Khurasan
		Report

18 November 2022	MGM Khadim	1–2	Abu Muslim
		Report

18 November 2022	Atalan	4–3	Azadi
		Report

=== Round 5 ===
19 November 2022	Aino Mina	3–1	Istiqlal
		Report

19 November 2022	Sorkh Poshan	1–1	Maiwand
		Report

20 November 2022	Wahidy	1–1	Khurasan
		Report

20 November 2022	Abu Muslim	2–0	Mawj Sahel
		Report

21 November 2022	Attack Energy	8–0	Azadi
		Report

21 November 2022	MGM Khadim	3–3	Atalan
		Report

=== Round 6 ===
22 November 2022	Sorkh Poshan	1–1	Istiqlal
		Report

22 November 2022	Aino Mina	6–1	Khurasan
		Report

23 November 2022	Abu Muslim	4–1	Maiwand
		Report

23 November 2022	Wahidy	7–4	Azadi
		Report

24 November 2022	Atalan	0–5	Mawj Sahel
		Report

24 November 2022	Attack Energy	1–0	MGM Khadim
		Report

=== Round 7 ===
25 November 2022	Istiqlal	5–1	Khurasan
		Report

25 November 2022	Abu Muslim	2–1	Sorkh Poshan
		Report

26 November 2022	Azadi	1–4	Aino Mina
		Report

26 November 2022	Atalan	3–8	Maiwand
		Report

27 November 2022	MGM Khadim	5–1	Wahidy
		Report

27 November 2022	Attack Energy	2–1	Mawj Sahel
		Report

=== Round 8 ===
28 November 2022	Abu Muslim	0–0	Istiqlal
		Report

28 November 2022	Azadi	4–3	Khurasan
		Report

29 November 2022	Atalan	0–2	Sorkh Poshan
		Report

29 November 2022	MGM Khadim	1–0	Aino Mina
		Report

30 November 2022	Attack Energy	2–1	Maiwand
		Report

30 November 2022	Mawj Sahel	7–2	Wahidy
		Report

=== Round 9 ===
1 December 2022	Istiqlal	5–3	Azadi
		Report

1 December 2022	Abu Muslim	8–1	Atalan
		Report

2 December 2022	MGM Khadim	8–2	Khurasan
		Report

2 December 2022	Attack Energy	1–0	Sorkh Poshan
		Report

3 December 2022	Mawj Sahel	2–3	Aino Mina
		Report

3 December 2022	Wahidy	0–7	Maiwand
		Report

=== Round 10 ===
4 December 2022	Istiqlal	8–1	Atalan
		Report

4 December 2022	Azadi	2–2	MGM Khadim
		Report

5 December 2022	Abu Muslim	1–1	Attack Energy
		Report

5 December 2022	Mawj Sahel	3–2	Khurasan
		Report

=== Round 11 ===
7 December 2022	MGM Khadim	6–3	Istiqlal
		Report

7 December 2022	Atalan	2–3	Attack Energy
		Report

8 December 2022	Mawj Sahel	5–2 (Note: Also reported 4–2.)	Azadi
		Report

8 December 2022	Abu Muslim	7–4	Wahidy
		Report

9 December 2022	Khurasan	0–1	Maiwand
		Report

9 December 2022	Sorkh Poshan	0–1	Aino Mina
		Report
