= Kayrat Izakov =

Kyrgyzstani footballer (born 1997)

Personal information
- Full name: Kayrat Kochkorbayevich Izakov
- Date of birth: 8 June 1997 (age 29)
- Place of birth: Karaköl, Kyrgyzstan
- Height: 1.70 m (5 ft 7 in)
- Position: Defender

Team information
- Current team: Abdysh-Ata Kant
- Number: 73

Senior career*
Years	Team	Apps	(Gls)
2018	Akademija Osh		
2019	Alga Bishkek		
2020	Neftchi Kochkor-Ata	14	(2)
2021–	Abdysh-Ata Kant		

International career^{‡}
2021–	Kyrgyzstan	3	(0)
- * Club domestic league appearances and goals as of 12 November 2021 ‡ National team caps and goals as of 12 November 2021

Kayrat Kochkorbayevich Izakov (Kyrgyz: Кайрат Ызаков; Russian: Кайрат Кочкорбаевич Изаков; born 8 June 1997) is a Kyrgyzstani professional footballer who plays for Abdysh-Ata Kant in the Kyrgyzstan League and Kyrgyzstan national football team as a defender.

== Career statistics ==
=== International ===
Kyrgyzstan national team
Year	Apps	Goals
2021	3	0
Total	3	0

Statistics accurate as of match played 11 November 2021
