= SC Eintracht Freising =

German football club

- Full name: Sportclub Eintracht Freising e.V
- Nickname: SE Freising
- Founded: 1927
- Stadium: Stadion Savoyer Au
- Capacity: 5,000
- Coordinates: 48°23′20.8″N 11°45′06.5″E
- Chairman: Walter Zellner
- Manager: Florian Bittner
- League: Landesliga Bayern-Südost
- 2021/2022: 16th
- Website: sefreising.de

SC Eintracht Freising is a football club based in Freising, Germany. The club was founded on May 1, 1927 and currently plays in the Landesliga Bayern-Südost.

== Players ==
=== First-team squad ===
As of 28 January 2023

Note: Flags indicate national team as defined under FIFA eligibility rules; some limited exceptions apply. Players may hold more than one non-FIFA nationality.

No.	Pos.	Nation	Player
30	GK	GER	Maximilian Oswald
1	GK	GER	Jonas Trost
—	DF	NGA	Osaro Aiteniora
28	DF	GER	Vitus Kirchberger
20	DF	GER	Johannes Kleindorfer
22	DF	GER	Fabian Löw
8	DF	GER	Jonas Mayr
19	DF	GER	Daniel Müller
18	DF	GER	Frederic Rist
13	DF	GER	Michael Schmid
5	MF	GER	Florian Bittner
18	MF	GER	Alexander Eppink
29	MF	GER	Felix Fischer
26	MF	GER	Leonardo Lechner
23	MF	TUR	Selim Magat
—	MF	GER	Staas Mitko
—	MF	GER	Sven Jannik Richter
11	MF	GER	Maximilian Rudzki
20	MF	GER	Liam Russo
24	MF	GER	Christian Schmuckermeier
6	MF	GER	Florian Schmuckermeier
27	MF	GER	Niklas Tatzer
4	MF	GER	Sebastian Thalhammer
10	MF	CRO	Domagoj Tiric
9	FW	GER	Luka Brundtloff
25	FW	GER	Felix Güzel
14	FW	GER	Marcos Hones
7	FW	GER	Florian Machel

=== Notable players ===
- Hans Pflügler played at SC Eintracht Freising from 1997 to 2001 and from 2002 to 2005. He has played for Bayern Munich, winning ten major titles and appearing in nearly 400 official games. Additionally, Pflügler represented West Germany at the Euro 1988 and 1990 World Cup, winning the tournament.
- Maximilian Haas began his footballing career at SC Eintracht Freising, playing there until 2007. He would later go on to play for clubs such as Bayern Munich, Middlesbrough, and SC Braga until retired in 2013.
- Stefan Haas began his youth career at SC Eintracht Freising, playing there until 2011. He would later go on to play for teams such as SC Mirandela and Leixões S.C. He currently plays at VfR Garching.
- Sebastian Bönig began his youth career at SC Eintracht Freising, playing there until 1996. He would later go on to play for clubs such as Bayern Munich and Union Berlin. He currently works as an assistant coach at Union Berlin.
- Philipp Bönig began his youth career at SC Eintracht Freising, playing there until 1994. He would later go on to play for clubs such as Bayern Munich and Vfl Bochum. He currently works as the manager of VfR Garching.
- Stefan Lex began his youth career at SC Eintracht Freising until he was signed by TSV Buchbach in 2009. He would later go on to play for clubs such as Greuther Fürth and FC Ingolstadt 04. He currently plays as a winger for 3. Liga club 1860 Munich.
