= Murodali Aknazarov =

Tajikistani footballer

Personal information
- Full name: Murodali Aknazarov; Муродали Акназаров
- Date of birth: 19 November 2004 (age 21)
- Place of birth: Dushanbe, Tajikistan
- Height: 1.77 m (5 ft 10 in)
- Position: Midfielder

Team information
- Current team: Samtredia
- Number: 38

Youth career
- 2020–2024: Antalyaspor

Senior career*
Years	Team	Apps	(Gls)
2024–	Samtredia	12	(0)

International career^{‡}
2023–	Tajikistan	3	(0)
- * Club domestic league appearances and goals as of 28 August 2024 ‡ National team caps and goals as of 18:42, 17 October 2023 (UTC)

Murodali Aknazarov (born 19 November 2004) is a Tajikistani footballer who currently plays for FC Samtredia of the Georgian Erovnuli Liga.

== Club career ==
=== Antalyaspor ===
Aknazarov joined Antalyaspor in January 2020. In summer 2021, he saw his first first-team action for the club.

=== FC Samtredia ===
Aknazarov joined FC Samtredia in February 2024. On the 2nd March 2024 he played his first game in a away defeat against FC Torpedo Kutaisi.

== International career ==
Aknazarov represented Tajikistan at the under-12 level in an international tournament in South Korea in 2015. He went on to score two goals in the tournament, one against the representative team from Mongolia's Sükhbaatar Province and a team from the host nation.

He was then part of his nation's squad that competed in the 2018 CAFA Youth Championship. Tajikistan went on to win bronze in the tournament.

Aknazarov was called up to the senior national team for the first time in November 2022 for a friendly versus Russia.

== Honours ==
=== International ===
==== Tajikistan ====
- Merdeka Tournament: 2023
