= Attack Energy SC =

Association football club in Afghanistan

Attack Energy
- Full name: Attack Energy Sport Club
- Short name: AESC
- Founded: 1947; 79 years ago
- Dissolved: 19 January 2025; 18 months ago
- Ground: Herat Stadium
- Capacity: 15,000
- Owner: Zalal Mowafaq Industrial Corporation
- Manager: Ali Yarzada
- League: Afghanistan Champions League
- 2024–25: Afghanistan Champions League, 2nd of 12
Home colours	Away colours

Attack Energy Sport Club (Dari: باشگاه فوتبال اتک انرژی, romanized: Bâšgâh-e Futbâl-e Attack Energy) was an Afghan professional football club based in Herat that played in the Afghanistan Champions League.

== History ==
Attack Energy was founded in 1947 and is a member of the regional Herat Football Federation. In 2019 the team won its regional league, the Herat Champions Cup. With a victory over Abu Muslim, Attack Energy clinched the 2022 Afghanistan Champions League championship with one game remaining. The club went undefeated in eleven matches to secure the title in its first league season. By winning the title, the club earned the right to compete in the AFC Cup if it met the licensing requirements.

Attack Energy won their second consecutive championship in 2024. The club finished the 11-match season unbeaten, without conceding a single goal. The club qualified for the 2024–25 AFC Challenge League qualifying round, the inaugural edition of the continental competition. On 19 January 2025, the club was dissolved after the allegations of match-fixing against the rival Abu Muslim FC in the 2024–25 Afghanistan Champions League.

== Domestic history ==
Key

Champion Runners-up Third place

Season	League							Cup	Notes
Season	Div.	Pos.	Pl.	W	D	L	Pts.	Cup	Notes
2022	I	1st	11	10	1	0	31		
2023	I	Not held							
2024	I	1st	11	11	0	0	33		

== Continental record ==
Results list Attack Energy SC's goal tally first.

Year	Competition	Round	Club	Home	Away	Aggregate
2024–25	AFC Challenge League	Qualifying play-off	(Kyrgyzstan) Abdysh-Ata Kant	No	No	0–2
