= Afghanistan Champions League =

- Founded: 2021; 5 years ago
- Country: Afghanistan
- Confederation: AFC
- Number of clubs: 12
- Level on pyramid: 1
- Relegation to: Province League
- International cup: AFC Challenge League
- Current champions: Abu Muslim (2) (2025)
- Most championships: Abu Muslim; Attack Energy (2 titles)
- Broadcaster: Ariana Television Network
- Current: 2026–27 Afghanistan Champions League

The Afghanistan Champions League is a professional men's football league run by the Afghanistan Football Federation (AFF). The competition commenced in 2021.

== History ==
The Afghanistan Champions League was established to replace the Afghan Premier League. The league consisted of 12 clubs from Kabul, Herat and Balkh. In 2023, the league was not held due to financial crisis. In January 2024, the Afghanistan Football Federation announced the return of the league. In 2024, Attack Energy won their second consecutive title after finishing the season unbeaten. Abu Muslim won their first ever Afghan league title in the 2024–25 season, also finishing undefeated. However, Abu Muslim's match against Adalat Farah, ending in a controversial 8–0 victory, was marred by the allegations of match-fixing.

== Champions ==
Year	Champion	Runner-up
2021	Sorkh Poshan	Istiqlal
2022	Attack Energy	Abu Muslim
2024	Attack Energy	Sorkh Poshan
2024–25	Abu Muslim	Attack Energy
2025	Abu Muslim	Sorkh Poshan
2026–27		

== League wins by club ==
Club	Wins	Winning year
Attack Energy	2	2022, 2024
Abu Muslim	2	2024–25, 2025
Sorkh Poshan	1	2021

== Clubs ==
The following 12 clubs competed in the 2024–25 Afghanistan Champions League season.

Club	Location
Abu Muslim	Farah
Aino Mina	Kandahar
Attack Energy	Herat
Istiqlal	Kabul
Arman	Kabul
Khurasan	Faryab
Mawj Sahel Sahet	Takhar
Perrozi Kabul	Kabul
Sarrafan	Herat
Sarsabz Yashlar	Faryab
Sorkh Poshan	Herat

== Media coverage and sponsorships ==
In April 2024, Ariana Television Network signed a deal with the Afghanistan Football Federation to broadcast the third season of the Afghanistan Champions League live, legally and exclusively. The league was sponsored by Victor Energy Drink.

== Awards ==
=== Top scorer ===
Year	Player/s	Club	Goals	Ref.
2021	N/A	N/A	N/A	
2022	N/A	N/A	N/A	
2024	(Afghanistan) Ahmed Nabi Muqddas	Aino Mina	N/A	
2024–25	(Afghanistan) Farhad Alizadeh	Sorkh Poshan	18	

=== Most Valuable Player ===
Year	Player/s	Club	Ref.
2021	N/A	N/A	
2022	N/A	N/A	
2024	(Afghanistan) Hamid Amiri	Sorkh Poshan	
2024–25	(Afghanistan) Zulfiqar Nazari	Abu Muslim	

=== Goalkeeper of the year ===
Year	Player/s	Club	Ref.
2021	N/A	N/A	
2022	N/A	N/A	
2024	(Afghanistan) Faisal Hamidi	Attack Energy	
2024–25	(Afghanistan) Faisal Hamidi	Attack Energy	

== See also ==
- Football in Afghanistan
- Kabul Premier League
