= FC Sorkh Poshan =

Sorkh Poshan
- Full name: Football Club Sorkh Poshan
- Founded: 2014; 12 years ago
- Ground: Various
- League: Afghanistan Champions League

Football Club Sorkh Poshan (Dari: باشگاه سرخ پوشان, romanized: Bâšgâh-e Sorkh-Poshan, lit. 'Red Army or Red Shirts'), also known as Sorkh Poshan Khafi, or Sorkh Poshan Herat, is an Afghan professional football club from Herat that currently plays in the Afghanistan Champions League.

== History ==
The club was established in 2014. In 2021, they participated in the revamped Afghanistan Champions League. The league consisted of 12 clubs that were runners up or winners of their provincial leagues, and the matches were held in Kabul, Herat and Balkh provinces. In the inaugural season, the club secured the title.

In the 2022 season, the club came seventh after securing three wins, three draws and four losses out of 11 matches.

== Honours ==
=== National ===
- Afghanistan Champions League
  - Champions: 2021
