= Istiqlal FC =

Istiqlal
- Full name: Istiqlal Football Club
- Founded: 2004; 22 years ago
- Ground: AFF Stadium
- Capacity: 6,000
- League: Afghanistan Champions League

Istiqlal FC (also written as Esteqlal FC), (Dari: استقلال) is an Afghan professional football club from Kabul that currently plays in the Afghanistan Champions League.

== History ==
Istiqlal FC was founded in 2004. Through the 2020 season, the club played in the Kabul Premier League. It has played in the Afghanistan Champions League since 2021.

== Domestic history ==
Key

Champion Runners-up 3rd place

Season	League							Cup	Notes
Season	Div.	Pos.	Pl.	W	D	L	Pts.	Cup	Notes
2021	I	2nd	11	8	2	1	26		
2022	I	8th	11	3	3	5	12		
2023	I	7th	11	5	0	6	15		

== Women's team ==
Istiqlal FC fielded a team in the Women's Football Premier League. In 2013, during the league's first season, they reached the final, before ultimately falling to Afghan Football Club.
