= Abu Muslim FC =

Afghan football club

Abu Muslim
- Full name: Abu Muslim Farah Football Club
- Nickname: The Champions of Qala-e-Fereydoun
- Short name: AMFFC
- Founded: 1967; 59 years ago
- Ground: Various
- President: Haji Abdul Hamid Sharifi
- Head coach: Ali Nazarzadeh
- League: Afghanistan Champions League
- 2025–26: Afghanistan Champions League, 1st of 12 (champions)
Home colours	Away colours	Third colours

Abu Muslim Farah Football Club (Persian: باشگاه فوتبال ابومسلم, romanized: Bâšgâh-e Futbâl-e Abu-Muslim) is an Afghan professional football club from Farah that currently plays in the Afghanistan Champions League.

== History ==
Abu Muslim Football Club was established in 1967. The club has been competing in the Afghanistan Champions League since its inception in 2021. The following year, the club achieved a commendable second-place finish, remaining unbeaten throughout the tournament.

The 2024–25 Afghanistan Champions League marked a notable season for Abu Muslim FC as they clinched their first Afghanistan Champions League title. The team completed the season undefeated, securing nine wins and one draw. However, their championship was overshadowed by controversy. A significant 8–0 victory against Adalat Farah raised allegations of match-fixing, especially since both clubs shared the same ownership. Attack Energy, along with seven other teams, lodged formal complaints with the AFF. Despite these actions, the AFF upheld Abu Muslim's championship, leading to Attack Energy's decision to disband in protest.

The club's triumph earned them qualification for the AFC Challenge League playoff, representing Afghanistan on a continental stage. Defender and former national team captain Haroon Amiri returned to Afghan football in January 2025, joining Abu Muslim with aspirations to mentor younger players. However, disillusioned by the alleged corruption and mismanagement, Amiri publicly criticized the federation and called for reforms.

== Honours ==
=== National ===
- Afghanistan Champions League
  - Champions: 2024–25, 2025
  - Runners-up: 2022

== Continental record ==
Results list Abu Muslim FC's goal tally first.

Year	Competition	Round	Club	Aggregate
2025–26	AFC Challenge League	Qualifying play-off	(Bhutan) Paro	0–1
2026–27	AFC Challenge League	Qualifying play-off	(Bhutan) Paro	0–2
