= 2008 East Asian Football Championship Final squads =

Below are the squads for the 2008 East Asian Football Championship tournament in China. There were 23 players in each squad, including 3 goalkeepers.

== China ==
Coach: (Serbia) Vladimir Petrovic

No.	Pos.	Player	Date of birth (age)	Caps	Club
1	GK	Zong Lei	26 July 1981 (aged 26)		(China) Changchun Yatai
2	DF	Zhang Shuai	20 July 1981 (aged 26)		(China) Beijing Guoan
3	DF	Sun Xiang	15 January 1982 (aged 26)		(China) Shanghai Shenhua
4	DF	Feng Xiaoting	22 October 1985 (aged 22)		(China) Dalian Shide
5	DF	Li Weifeng (captain)	1 December 1978 (aged 29)		(China) Shanghai Shenhua
6	MF	Wang Dong	10 September 1981 (aged 26)		(China) Changchun Yatai
7	FW	Qu Bo	15 July 1981 (aged 26)		(China) Qingdao Zhongneng
8	MF	Du Zhenyu	1 February 1983 (aged 25)		(China) Changchun Yatai
9	MF	Hao Junmin	24 March 1987 (aged 20)		(China) Tianjin Teda
10	MF	Zhao Junzhe	18 April 1979 (aged 28)		(China) Liaoning Whowin
11	FW	Zhu Ting	15 July 1985 (aged 22)		(China) Dalian Shide
12	GK	Chen Dong	3 May 1978 (aged 29)		(China) Dalian Shide
13	DF	Zhang Yonghai	15 March 1979 (aged 28)		(China) Beijing Guoan
14	MF	Li Yan	20 June 1980 (aged 27)		(China) Shaanxi Baorong
15	MF	Liu Jian	20 January 1985 (aged 23)		(China) Qingdao Zhongneng
16	MF	Zhou Haibin	19 July 1985 (aged 22)		(China) Shandong Luneng
17	MF	Wang Song	12 October 1983 (aged 24)		(China) Chengdu Blades
18	DF	Xu Yunlong	17 February 1979 (aged 29)		(China) Beijing Guoan
19	DF	Wang Xiao	30 August 1979 (aged 28)		(China) Tianjin Teda
20	MF	Zhang Xiaofei	11 July 1982 (aged 25)		(China) Changchun Yatai
21	FW	Jiang Ning	1 September 1986 (aged 21)		(China) Qingdao Zhongneng
22	GK	Song Zhenyu	11 September 1981 (aged 26)		(China) Changsha Ginde
23	FW	Lü Zheng	5 February 1985 (aged 23)		(China) Shandong Luneng

== Japan ==
Coach: (Japan) Takeshi Okada

No.	Pos.	Player	Date of birth (age)	Caps	Club
1	GK	Yoshikatsu Kawaguchi (captain)	15 August 1975 (aged 32)		(Japan) Jubilo Iwata
2	MF	Yasuyuki Konno	25 January 1983 (aged 25)		(Japan) FC Tokyo
3	DF	Yuichi Komano	25 July 1981 (aged 26)		(Japan) Jubilo Iwata
4	DF	Daiki Iwamasa	30 January 1982 (aged 26)		(Japan) Kashima Antlers
5	DF	Michihiro Yasuda	20 December 1987 (aged 20)		(Japan) Gamba Osaka
7	MF	Yasuhito Endo	28 January 1980 (aged 28)		(Japan) Gamba Osaka
8	MF	Naotake Hanyu	22 December 1979 (aged 28)		(Japan) FC Tokyo
9	MF	Satoru Yamagishi	3 May 1983 (aged 24)		(Japan) Kawasaki Frontale
10	MF	Koji Yamase	22 September 1981 (aged 26)		(Japan) Yokohama F. Marinos
11	FW	Ryuji Bando	2 August 1979 (aged 28)		(Japan) Gamba Osaka
12	FW	Yuzo Tashiro	22 July 1982 (aged 25)		(Japan) Kashima Antlers
13	MF	Keita Suzuki	8 July 1981 (aged 26)		(Japan) Urawa Red Diamonds
14	MF	Kengo Nakamura	24 October 1980 (aged 27)		(Japan) Kawasaki Frontale
15	DF	Hiroki Mizumoto	12 September 1985 (aged 22)		(Japan) Gamba Osaka
17	FW	Ryoichi Maeda	9 October 1981 (aged 26)		(Japan) Jubilo Iwata
18	GK	Seigo Narazaki	15 April 1976 (aged 31)		(Japan) Nagoya Grampus Eight
20	FW	Kisho Yano	5 April 1984 (aged 23)		(Japan) Albirex Niigata
21	DF	Akira Kaji	13 January 1980 (aged 28)		(Japan) Gamba Osaka
22	DF	Yuji Nakazawa	25 February 1978 (aged 29)		(Japan) Yokohama F. Marinos
23	GK	Eiji Kawashima	20 March 1983 (aged 24)		(Japan) Kawasaki Frontale
24	MF	Hideo Hashimoto	21 May 1979 (aged 28)		(Japan) Gamba Osaka
25	DF	Atsuto Uchida	27 March 1988 (aged 19)		(Japan) Kashima Antlers

== North Korea ==
Coach: (North Korea) Kim Jong-hun

No.	Pos.	Player	Date of birth (age)	Caps	Club
1	GK	Ri Myong-Guk	9 September 1986 (aged 21)		(North Korea) Pyongyang City
2	DF	Cha Jong-Hyok	25 September 1985 (aged 22)		(North Korea) Amrokgang
3	DF	Ri Jun-Il	24 August 1987 (aged 20)		(North Korea) Sobaeksu Sports Group
4	MF	Pak Nam-Chol	2 July 1985 (aged 22)		(North Korea) 4.25
5	DF	Ri Kwang-Chon	4 September 1985 (aged 22)		(North Korea) 4.25
6	DF	So Hyok-Chol	19 February 1982 (aged 25)		(North Korea) Pyongyang City
7	FW	Kim Myong-won	15 July 1983 (aged 24)		(North Korea) Amrokgang
8	MF	Ji Yun-Nam	20 November 1976 (aged 31)		(North Korea) 4.25
9	MF	An Yong-Hak	25 October 1978 (aged 29)		(South Korea) Suwon Samsung Bluewings
11	MF	Mun In-Guk	29 September 1978 (aged 29)		(North Korea) 4.25
12	FW	Jong Tae-Se	2 March 1984 (aged 23)		(Japan) Kawasaki Frontale
13	DF	Pak Chol-Jin	5 September 1985 (aged 22)		(North Korea) Amrokgang
14	DF	Han Song-Chol (captain)	10 July 1977 (aged 30)		(North Korea) 4.25
15	MF	Kim Yong-Jun	19 July 1983 (aged 24)		(North Korea) Pyongyang City
16	DF	Nam Song-Chol	7 May 1982 (aged 25)		(North Korea) 4.25
17	FW	Choe Chol-Man	22 September 1985 (aged 22)		(North Korea) 4.25
18	GK	Kim Myong-Gil	16 October 1984 (aged 23)		(North Korea) Amrokgang
19	FW	An Chol-Hyok	27 June 1985 (aged 22)		(North Korea) Rimyongsu
20	MF	Ryang Yong-Gi	7 January 1982 (aged 26)		(Japan) Vegalta Sendai
21	MF	Kim Song-Chol	29 August 1983 (aged 24)		(North Korea) Kigwancha
22	FW	Kim Kum-Il	10 October 1987 (aged 20)		(North Korea) 4.25
23	FW	Pak Chol-Min	10 December 1988 (aged 19)		(North Korea) Rimyongsu
24	GK	Ju Kwang-Min	20 May 1990 (aged 17)		(North Korea) Kigwancha

== South Korea ==
Coach: (South Korea) Huh Jung-moo

No.	Pos.	Player	Date of birth (age)	Caps	Club
1	GK	Kim Yong-dae	11 October 1979 (aged 28)		(South Korea) Gwangju Sangmu
2	MF	Lee Jong-min	1 September 1983 (aged 24)		(South Korea) Ulsan Hyundai
3	DF	Cho Won-hee	17 April 1983 (aged 24)		(South Korea) Suwon Samsung Bluewings
4	DF	Cho Yong-hyung	3 November 1983 (aged 24)		(South Korea) Jeju United
5	MF	Kim Nam-il (captain)	14 March 1977 (aged 30)		(Japan) Vissel Kobe
6	DF	Cho Sung-hwan	9 April 1982 (aged 25)		(South Korea) Pohang Steelers
7	FW	Lee Keun-ho	11 April 1985 (aged 22)		(South Korea) Daegu FC
8	MF	Lee Kwan-woo	25 February 1978 (aged 29)		(South Korea) Suwon Samsung Bluewings
9	FW	Cho Jin-soo	2 September 1983 (aged 24)		(South Korea) Jeju United
10	FW	Park Chu-young	10 July 1985 (aged 22)		(South Korea) FC Seoul
11	MF	Yeom Ki-hun	30 March 1983 (aged 24)		(South Korea) Ulsan Hyundai
12	MF	Lee Sang-ho	9 May 1987 (aged 20)		(South Korea) Jeju United
13	MF	Park Won-jae	28 May 1984 (aged 23)		(South Korea) Pohang Steelers
14	DF	Kang Min-soo	14 February 1986 (aged 22)		(South Korea) Jeonbuk Hyundai Motors
15	DF	Kwak Hee-ju	5 October 1981 (aged 26)		(South Korea) Suwon Samsung Bluewings
16	DF	Kwak Tae-hwi	8 July 1981 (aged 26)		(South Korea) Chunnam Dragons
18	GK	Jung Sung-ryong	4 January 1985 (aged 23)		(South Korea) Pohang Steelers
19	MF	Hwang Ji-soo	27 March 1981 (aged 26)		(South Korea) Pohang Steelers
20	MF	Oh Jang-eun	24 July 1985 (aged 22)		(South Korea) Ulsan Hyundai
21	MF	Koo Ja-cheol	27 February 1989 (aged 18)		(South Korea) Jeju United
22	FW	Ko Ki-gu	31 July 1980 (aged 27)		(South Korea) Chunnam Dragons
23	GK	Yeom Dong-gyun	6 September 1983 (aged 24)		(South Korea) Chunnam Dragons
