= Brazil at the 2010 FIFA World Cup =

Matches of the Brazil national football team in the 2010 FIFA World Cup

The following article concerns the performance of Brazil at the 2010 FIFA World Cup. Brazil won both their initial qualification group and their group during the tournament itself. They reached the quarter-final stages where they were knocked out by the eventual tournament runners-up, the Netherlands.

== Qualification ==
Brazil finished top of the CONMEBOL league table. Matches were played from October 2007 to October 2009.

=== Final positions ===
Pos	Team	Pld	W	D	L	GF	GA	GD	Pts	Qualification
1	Brazil	18	9	7	2	33	11	+22	34	2010 FIFA World Cup
2	Chile	18	10	3	5	32	22	+10	33	2010 FIFA World Cup
3	Paraguay	18	10	3	5	24	16	+8	33	2010 FIFA World Cup
4	Argentina	18	8	4	6	23	20	+3	28	2010 FIFA World Cup
5	Uruguay	18	6	6	6	28	20	+8	24	Inter-confederation play-offs
6	Ecuador	18	6	5	7	22	26	−4	23	
7	Colombia	18	6	5	7	14	18	−4	23	
8	Venezuela	18	6	4	8	23	29	−6	22	
9	Bolivia	18	4	3	11	22	36	−14	15	
10	Peru	18	3	4	11	11	34	−23	13	

Source: FIFA

== Pre-tournament friendlies ==
10 February 2009

Brazil	2–0	Italy
Elano 13'; Robinho 27'

Emirates Stadium, London, United Kingdom
Attendance: 60,077
12 August 2009

Estonia	0–1	Brazil
		Luís Fabiano 43'

Lilleküla Stadium, Tallinn, Estonia
Attendance: 8,550
14 November 2009

Brazil	1–0	England
Nilmar 47'

Sheikh Khalifa International Stadium, Al Ain, United Arab Emirates
Attendance: 50,000
18 November 2009

Oman	0–2	Brazil
		Nilmar 4'; Mudhafar 61' (o.g.)

Sultan Qaboos Sports Complex, Muscat, Oman
Attendance: 20,000

== Squad ==
Coach: Carlos Dunga

The selection was characterized by the omission of several fully fit high-profile attacking players, such as Ronaldo, Ronaldinho, Adriano, and Alexandre Pato, as well as the 18-year-old domestic talent Neymar.

No.	Pos.	Player	Date of birth (age)	Caps	Club
1	GK	Júlio César	3 September 1979 (aged 30)	47	(Italy) Inter Milan
2	DF	Maicon	26 July 1981 (aged 28)	56	(Italy) Inter Milan
3	DF	Lúcio (c)	8 May 1978 (aged 32)	89	(Italy) Inter Milan
4	DF	Juan	1 February 1979 (aged 31)	73	(Italy) Roma
5	MF	Felipe Melo	26 August 1983 (aged 26)	16	(Italy) Juventus
6	DF	Michel Bastos	2 August 1983 (aged 26)	3	(France) Lyon
7	MF	Elano	14 June 1981 (aged 28)	41	(Turkey) Galatasaray
8	MF	Gilberto Silva	7 October 1976 (aged 33)	86	(Greece) Panathinaikos
9	FW	Luís Fabiano	8 November 1980 (aged 29)	36	(Spain) Sevilla
10	MF	Kaká	22 April 1982 (aged 28)	76	(Spain) Real Madrid
11	FW	Robinho	25 January 1984 (aged 26)	73	(Brazil) Santos
12	GK	Heurelho Gomes	15 February 1981 (aged 29)	9	(England) Tottenham Hotspur
13	DF	Dani Alves	6 May 1983 (aged 27)	33	(Spain) Barcelona
14	DF	Luisão	13 February 1981 (aged 29)	40	(Portugal) Benfica
15	DF	Thiago Silva	22 September 1984 (aged 25)	4	(Italy) Milan
16	DF	Gilberto	25 April 1976 (aged 34)	32	(Brazil) Cruzeiro
17	MF	Josué	19 July 1979 (aged 30)	26	(Germany) VfL Wolfsburg
18	MF	Ramires	24 March 1987 (aged 23)	11	(Portugal) Benfica
19	MF	Júlio Baptista	1 October 1981 (aged 28)	45	(Italy) Roma
20	MF	Kléberson	19 June 1979 (aged 30)	31	(Brazil) Flamengo
21	FW	Nilmar	14 July 1984 (aged 25)	15	(Spain) Villarreal
22	GK	Doni	22 October 1979 (aged 30)	10	(Italy) Roma
23	FW	Grafite	2 April 1979 (aged 31)	2	(Germany) VfL Wolfsburg

== Group stages ==
=== Brazil vs North Korea ===
15 June 2010
20:30

Brazil	2–1	North Korea
Maicon 55'; Elano 72'	Report	Ji Yun-nam 89'

Ellis Park Stadium, Johannesburg
Attendance: 54,331
Referee: Viktor Kassai (Hungary)

Brazil	North Korea

BRAZIL:
GK	1	Júlio César
RB	2	Maicon
CB	3	Lúcio (c)
CB	4	Juan
LB	6	Michel Bastos
DM	8	Gilberto Silva
CM	7	Elano		(substituted off) 73'
CM	5	Felipe Melo		(substituted off) 84'
AM	10	Kaká		(substituted off) 78'
SS	11	Robinho
CF	9	Luís Fabiano
Substitutions:
DF	13	Dani Alves		(substituted on) 73'
FW	21	Nilmar		(substituted on) 78'
MF	18	Ramires	(yellow card) 88'	(substituted on) 84'
Manager:
Dunga

NORTH KOREA:
GK	1	Ri Myong-guk
RB	2	Cha Jong-hyok
CB	13	Pak Chol-jin
CB	4	Pak Nam-chol
LB	5	Ri Kwang-chon
DM	3	Ri Jun-il
RM	11	Mun In-guk	(substituted off) 80'
LM	8	Ji Yun-nam
AM	10	Hong Yong-jo (c)
AM	17	An Yong-hak
CF	9	Jong Tae-se
Substitutions:
FW	6	Kim Kum-il	(substituted on) 80'
Manager:
Kim Jong-hun

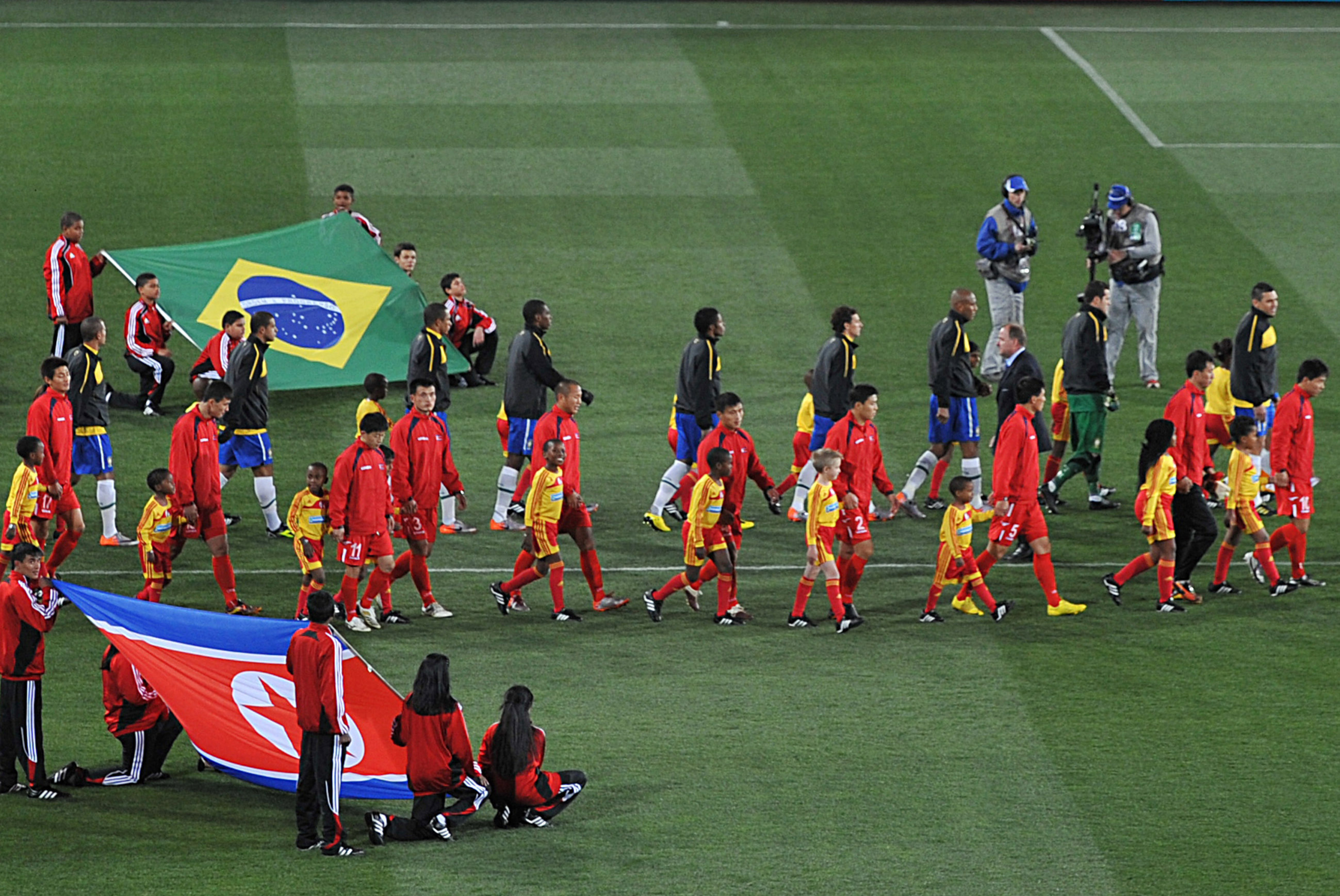
Brazil vs North Korea

Man of the Match:
Maicon (Brazil)

Assistant referees:
Gábor Erős (Hungary)
Tibor Vámos (Hungary)
Fourth official:
Subkhiddin Mohd Salleh (Malaysia)
Fifth official:
Mu Yuxin (China PR)

=== Brazil vs Ivory Coast ===
20 June 2010
20:30

Brazil	3–1	Ivory Coast
Luís Fabiano 25', 50'; Elano 62'	Report	Drogba 79'

Soccer City, Johannesburg
Attendance: 84,455
Referee: Stéphane Lannoy (France)

Brazil	Ivory Coast

BRAZIL:
GK	1	Júlio César
RB	2	Maicon
CB	3	Lúcio (c)
CB	4	Juan
LB	6	Michel Bastos
DM	8	Gilberto Silva
RM	7	Elano		(substituted off) 67'
LM	5	Felipe Melo
AM	10	Kaká	(yellow card) 85' (yellow-red card) 88'
SS	11	Robinho		(substituted off) 90+3'
CF	9	Luís Fabiano
Substitutions:
DF	13	Dani Alves		(substituted on) 67'
MF	18	Ramires		(substituted on) 90+3'
Manager:
Dunga

CÔTE D'IVOIRE:
GK	1	Boubacar Barry
RB	20	Guy Demel
CB	4	Kolo Touré
CB	5	Didier Zokora
LB	17	Siaka Tiéné	(yellow card) 31'
DM	19	Yaya Touré
CM	21	Emmanuel Eboué		(substituted off) 72'
CM	9	Cheick Tioté	(yellow card) 86'
RW	15	Aruna Dindane		(substituted off) 54'
LW	8	Salomon Kalou		(substituted off) 68'
CF	11	Didier Drogba (c)
Substitutions:
FW	10	Gervinho		(substituted on) 54'
MF	18	Kader Keïta	(yellow card) 75'	(substituted on) 68'
MF	13	Romaric		(substituted on) 72'
Manager:
(Sweden) Sven-Göran Eriksson

Man of the Match:
Luís Fabiano (Brazil)

Assistant referees:
Éric Dansault (France)
Laurent Ugo (France)
Fourth official:
Subkhiddin Mohd Salleh (Malaysia)
Fifth official:
Mu Yuxin (China PR)

=== Portugal vs Brazil ===
25 June 2010
16:00

Portugal	0–0	Brazil
	Report

Moses Mabhida Stadium, Durban
Attendance: 62,712
Referee: Benito Archundia (Mexico)

Portugal	Brazil

PORTUGAL:
GK	1	Eduardo
RB	21	Ricardo Costa
CB	6	Ricardo Carvalho
CB	2	Bruno Alves
LB	5	Duda	(yellow card) 25'	(substituted off) 54'
DM	15	Pepe	(yellow card) 40'	(substituted off) 64'
CM	19	Tiago	(yellow card) 31'
CM	16	Raul Meireles		(substituted off) 84'
RW	10	Danny
LW	23	Fábio Coentrão	(yellow card) 45'
CF	7	Cristiano Ronaldo (c)
Substitutions:
MF	11	Simão		(substituted on) 54'
MF	8	Pedro Mendes		(substituted on) 64'
MF	14	Miguel Veloso		(substituted on) 84'
Manager:
Carlos Queiroz

BRAZIL:
GK	1	Júlio César
RB	2	Maicon
CB	3	Lúcio (c)
CB	4	Juan	(yellow card) 25'
LB	6	Michel Bastos
DM	8	Gilberto Silva
CM	13	Dani Alves
CM	5	Felipe Melo	(yellow card) 43'	(substituted off) 44'
RF	21	Nilmar
CF	19	Júlio Baptista		(substituted off) 82'
LF	9	Luís Fabiano	(yellow card) 15'	(substituted off) 85'
Substitutions:
MF	17	Josué		(substituted on) 44'
MF	18	Ramires		(substituted on) 82'
FW	23	Grafite		(substituted on) 85'
Manager:
Dunga

Man of the Match:
Cristiano Ronaldo (Portugal)

Assistant referees:
Héctor Vergara (Canada)
Marvin Torrentera (Mexico)
Fourth official:
Peter O'Leary (New Zealand)
Fifth official:
Brent Best (New Zealand)

=== Final table ===
Pos	Team	Pld	W	D	L	GF	GA	GD	Pts	Qualification
1	Brazil	3	2	1	0	5	2	+3	7	Advance to knockout stage
2	Portugal	3	1	2	0	7	0	+7	5	Advance to knockout stage
3	Ivory Coast	3	1	1	1	4	3	+1	4	
4	North Korea	3	0	0	3	1	12	−11	0	

Source: FIFA
Rules for classification: Tie-breaking criteria

== Round of 16 ==
28 June 2010
20:30

Brazil	3–0	Chile
Juan 35'; Luís Fabiano 38'; Robinho 59'	Report

Ellis Park Stadium, Johannesburg
Attendance: 54,096
Referee: Howard Webb (England)

Brazil	Chile

GK	1	Júlio César
RB	2	Maicon
CB	3	Lúcio (c)
CB	4	Juan
LB	6	Michel Bastos
DM	8	Gilberto Silva
RM	13	Dani Alves
LM	18	Ramires	(yellow card) 72'
AM	10	Kaká	(yellow card) 30'	(substituted off) 81'
SS	11	Robinho		(substituted off) 85'
CF	9	Luís Fabiano		(substituted off) 76'
Substitutions:
FW	21	Nilmar		(substituted on) 76'
MF	20	Kléberson		(substituted on) 81'
DF	16	Gilberto		(substituted on) 85'
Manager:
Dunga

GK	1	Claudio Bravo (c)
RB	4	Mauricio Isla		(substituted off) 62'
CB	5	Pablo Contreras		(substituted off) 46'
CB	18	Gonzalo Jara
LB	2	Ismael Fuentes	(yellow card) 68'
RM	8	Arturo Vidal	(yellow card) 47'
CM	6	Carlos Carmona
LM	15	Jean Beausejour
RW	7	Alexis Sánchez
CF	9	Humberto Suazo
LW	11	Mark González		(substituted off) 46'
Substitutions:
MF	10	Jorge Valdivia		(substituted on) 46'
MF	21	Rodrigo Tello		(substituted on) 46'
MF	20	Rodrigo Millar	(yellow card) 80'	(substituted on) 62'
Manager:
(Argentina) Marcelo Bielsa

Man of the Match:
Robinho (Brazil)

Assistant referees:
Darren Cann (England)
Mike Mullarkey (England)
Fourth official:
Martin Hansson (Sweden)
Fifth official:
Stefan Wittberg (Sweden)

== Quarter-finals ==
The Netherlands came from behind to beat Brazil 2–1, handing the Brazilians their first loss in a World Cup match held outside Europe, other than in a penalty shoot-out, since 1950.

2 July 2010
16:00

Netherlands	2–1	Brazil
Sneijder 53', 68'	Report	Robinho 10'

Nelson Mandela Bay Stadium, Port Elizabeth
Attendance: 40,186
Referee: Yuichi Nishimura (Japan)

Netherlands	Brazil

GK	1	Maarten Stekelenburg
RB	2	Gregory van der Wiel	(yellow card) 47'
CB	3	John Heitinga	(yellow card) 14'
CB	13	André Ooijer	(yellow card) 76'
LB	5	Giovanni van Bronckhorst (c)
DM	6	Mark van Bommel
DM	8	Nigel de Jong	(yellow card) 64'
RW	11	Arjen Robben
AM	10	Wesley Sneijder
LW	7	Dirk Kuyt
CF	9	Robin van Persie		(substituted off) 85'
Substitutions:
FW	21	Klaas-Jan Huntelaar		(substituted on) 85'
Manager:
Bert van Marwijk

GK	1	Júlio César
RB	2	Maicon
CB	3	Lúcio (c)
CB	4	Juan
LB	6	Michel Bastos	(yellow card) 37'	(substituted off) 62'
DM	5	Felipe Melo	(red card) 73'
RM	13	Dani Alves
LM	8	Gilberto Silva
AM	10	Kaká
SS	11	Robinho
CF	9	Luís Fabiano		(substituted off) 77'
Substitutions:
DF	16	Gilberto		(substituted on) 62'
FW	21	Nilmar		(substituted on) 77'
Manager:
Dunga

Man of the Match:
Wesley Sneijder (Netherlands)

Assistant referees:
Toru Sagara (Japan)
Jeong Hae-sang (Korea Republic)
Fourth official:
Khalil Al Ghamdi (Saudi Arabia)
Fifth official:
Hassan Kamranifar (Iran)
