= 2010 FIFA World Cup Group G =

Football tournament

Group G of the 2010 FIFA World Cup began on 15 June and ended on 25 June 2010. The group consisted of reigning Copa América champion Brazil, North Korea, the Ivory Coast and Portugal.

Brazil and Portugal were also drawn in the same group at the 1966 FIFA World Cup, their previous official World Cup match. In 1966, the Portuguese team defeated Brazil 3–1, thus eliminating the defending champions, to advance to the quarter-finals where they encountered and defeated North Korea (another team in Group G) 5–3 after trailing 0–3.

As winners of the group, Brazil advanced to play against Chile – runners-up in Group H – in the Round of 16, while Portugal – the Group G runners-up – met Spain, who won Group H. Ivory Coast finished third in the group and North Korea finished bottom. The North Koreans had a goal difference of −11, the worst of any team at the tournament, largely due to the 7–0 defeat they suffered against Portugal; that match was Portugal's biggest-ever World Cup win and North Korea's heaviest-ever defeat. It was also the first time a live football match was broadcast on North Korean television.

== Standings ==
Pos	Team	Pld	W	D	L	GF	GA	GD	Pts	Qualification
1	Brazil	3	2	1	0	5	2	+3	7	Advance to knockout stage
2	Portugal	3	1	2	0	7	0	+7	5	Advance to knockout stage
3	Ivory Coast	3	1	1	1	4	3	+1	4	
4	North Korea	3	0	0	3	1	12	−11	0	

Source: FIFA
Rules for classification: Tie-breaking criteria
- Brazil advanced to play Chile (runners-up of Group H) in the round of 16.
- Portugal advanced to play Spain (winners of Group H) in the round of 16.

== Matches ==
All times local (UTC+2)

=== Ivory Coast vs Portugal ===
15 June 2010
16:00

Ivory Coast	0–0	Portugal

Nelson Mandela Bay Stadium, Port Elizabeth
Attendance: 37,034
Referee: Jorge Larrionda (Uruguay)

Ivory Coast	Portugal

GK	1	Boubacar Barry
RB	20	Guy Demel	(yellow card) 21'
CB	4	Kolo Touré (c)
CB	5	Didier Zokora	(yellow card) 7'
LB	17	Siaka Tiéné
DM	19	Yaya Touré
CM	21	Emmanuel Eboué		(substituted off) 89'
CM	9	Cheick Tioté
RW	10	Gervinho		(substituted off) 82'
LW	8	Salomon Kalou		(substituted off) 66'
CF	15	Aruna Dindane
Substitutions:
FW	11	Didier Drogba		(substituted on) 66'
MF	18	Kader Keïta		(substituted on) 82'
MF	13	Romaric		(substituted on) 89'
Manager:
(Sweden) Sven-Göran Eriksson

GK	1	Eduardo
RB	3	Paulo Ferreira
CB	2	Bruno Alves
CB	6	Ricardo Carvalho
LB	23	Fábio Coentrão
DM	8	Pedro Mendes
CM	20	Deco		(substituted off) 62'
CM	16	Raul Meireles		(substituted off) 85'
RW	7	Cristiano Ronaldo (c)	(yellow card) 21'
LW	10	Danny		(substituted off) 55'
CF	9	Liédson
Substitutions:
FW	11	Simão		(substituted on) 55'
MF	19	Tiago		(substituted on) 62'
MF	17	Ruben Amorim		(substituted on) 85'
Manager:
Carlos Queiroz

Man of the Match:
Cristiano Ronaldo (Portugal)

Assistant referees:
Pablo Fandino (Uruguay)
Mauricio Espinosa (Uruguay)
Fourth official:
Martín Vázquez (Uruguay)
Fifth official:
Miguel Nievas (Uruguay)

=== Brazil vs North Korea ===
15 June 2010
20:30

Brazil	2–1	North Korea
Maicon 55'; Elano 72'		Ji Yun-nam 89'

Ellis Park Stadium, Johannesburg
Attendance: 54,331
Referee: Viktor Kassai (Hungary)

Brazil	North Korea

GK	1	Júlio César
RB	2	Maicon
CB	3	Lúcio (c)
CB	4	Juan
LB	6	Michel Bastos
DM	8	Gilberto Silva
CM	7	Elano		(substituted off) 73'
CM	5	Felipe Melo		(substituted off) 84'
AM	10	Kaká		(substituted off) 78'
SS	11	Robinho
CF	9	Luís Fabiano
Substitutions:
DF	13	Dani Alves		(substituted on) 73'
FW	21	Nilmar		(substituted on) 78'
MF	18	Ramires	(yellow card) 88'	(substituted on) 84'
Manager:
Dunga

GK	1	Ri Myong-guk
RB	2	Cha Jong-hyok
CB	13	Pak Chol-jin
CB	4	Pak Nam-chol
LB	5	Ri Kwang-chon
DM	3	Ri Jun-il
RM	11	Mun In-guk	(substituted off) 80'
LM	8	Ji Yun-nam
AM	10	Hong Yong-jo (c)
AM	17	An Yong-hak
CF	9	Jong Tae-se
Substitutions:
FW	6	Kim Kum-il	(substituted on) 80'
Manager:
Kim Jong-hun

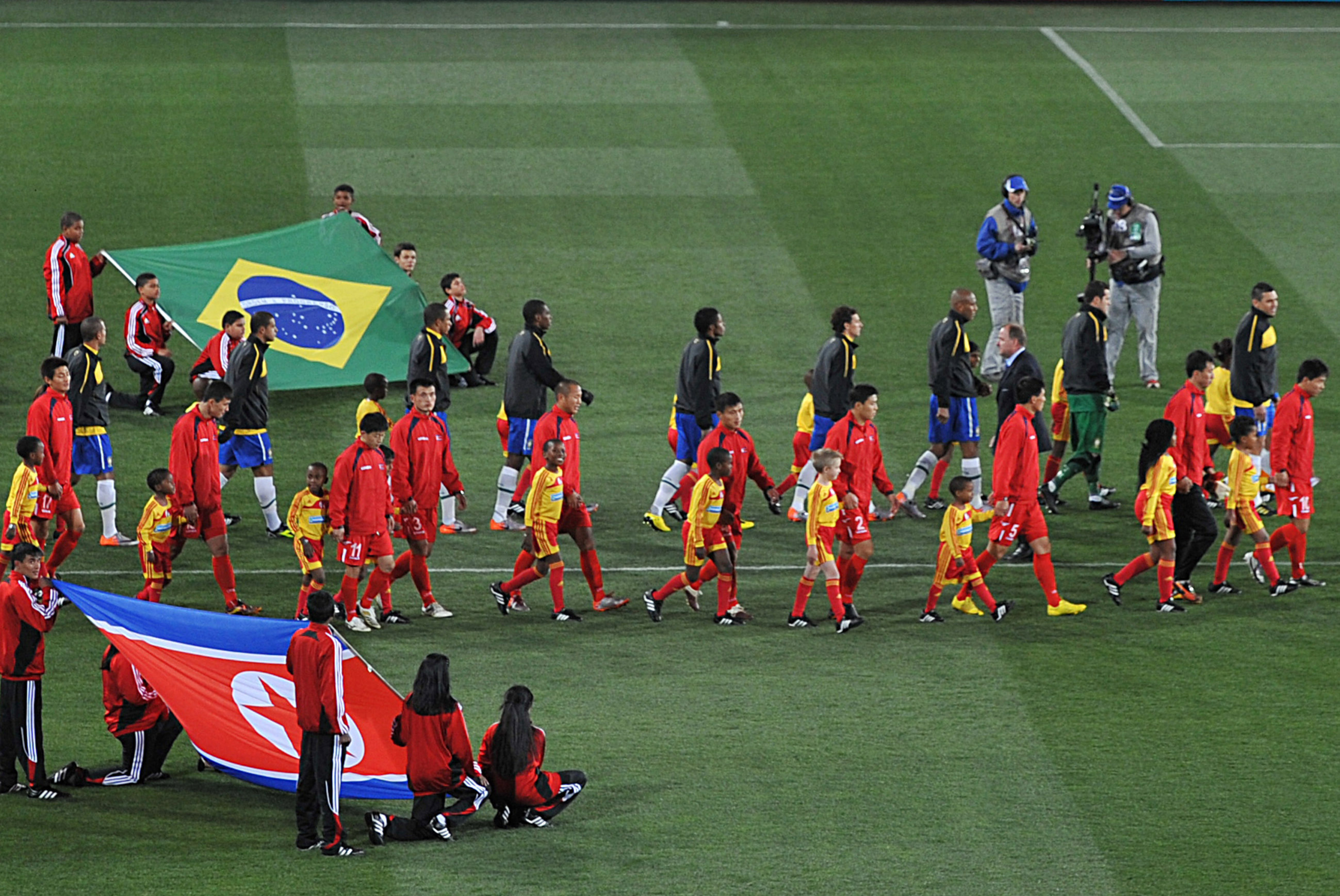
Brazil vs North Korea

Man of the Match:
Maicon (Brazil)

Assistant referees:
Gábor Erős (Hungary)
Tibor Vámos (Hungary)
Fourth official:
Subkhiddin Mohd Salleh (Malaysia)
Fifth official:
Mu Yuxin (China)

=== Brazil vs Ivory Coast ===
20 June 2010
20:30

Brazil	3–1	Ivory Coast
Luís Fabiano 25', 50'; Elano 62'		Drogba 79'

Soccer City, Johannesburg
Attendance: 84,455
Referee: Stéphane Lannoy (France)

Brazil	Ivory Coast

GK	1	Júlio César
RB	2	Maicon
CB	3	Lúcio (c)
CB	4	Juan
LB	6	Michel Bastos
DM	8	Gilberto Silva
RM	7	Elano		(substituted off) 67'
LM	5	Felipe Melo
AM	10	Kaká	(yellow card) 85' (yellow-red card) 88'
SS	11	Robinho		(substituted off) 90+3'
CF	9	Luís Fabiano
Substitutions:
DF	13	Dani Alves		(substituted on) 67'
MF	18	Ramires		(substituted on) 90+3'
Manager:
Dunga

GK	1	Boubacar Barry
RB	20	Guy Demel
CB	4	Kolo Touré
CB	5	Didier Zokora
LB	17	Siaka Tiéné	(yellow card) 31'
DM	19	Yaya Touré
CM	21	Emmanuel Eboué		(substituted off) 72'
CM	9	Cheick Tioté	(yellow card) 86'
RW	15	Aruna Dindane		(substituted off) 54'
LW	8	Salomon Kalou		(substituted off) 68'
CF	11	Didier Drogba (c)
Substitutions:
FW	10	Gervinho		(substituted on) 54'
MF	18	Kader Keïta	(yellow card) 75'	(substituted on) 68'
MF	13	Romaric		(substituted on) 72'
Manager:
(Sweden) Sven-Göran Eriksson

Man of the Match:
Luís Fabiano (Brazil)

Assistant referees:
Eric Dansault (France)
Laurent Ugo (France)
Fourth official:
Subkhiddin Mohd Salleh (Malaysia)
Fifth official:
Mu Yuxin (China)

=== Portugal vs North Korea ===
21 June 2010
13:30

Portugal	7–0	North Korea
Meireles 29'; Simão 53'; Almeida 56'; Tiago 60', 89'; Liédson 81'; Ronaldo 87'

Cape Town Stadium, Cape Town
Attendance: 63,644
Referee: Pablo Pozo (Chile)

Portugal	North Korea

GK	1	Eduardo
RB	13	Miguel
CB	6	Ricardo Carvalho
CB	2	Bruno Alves
LB	23	Fábio Coentrão
DM	8	Pedro Mendes	(yellow card) 38'
CM	19	Tiago
CM	16	Raul Meireles		(substituted off) 70'
RW	7	Cristiano Ronaldo (c)
LW	11	Simão		(substituted off) 74'
CF	18	Hugo Almeida	(yellow card) 70'	(substituted off) 77'
Substitutions:
MF	14	Miguel Veloso		(substituted on) 70'
DF	5	Duda		(substituted on) 74'
FW	9	Liédson		(substituted on) 77'
Manager:
Carlos Queiroz

GK	1	Ri Myong-guk
RB	2	Cha Jong-hyok		(substituted off) 75'
CB	13	Pak Chol-jin	(yellow card) 32'
CB	3	Ri Jun-il
CB	8	Ji Yun-nam
LB	5	Ri Kwang-chon
DM	17	An Yong-hak
RM	11	Mun In-guk		(substituted off) 58'
CM	4	Pak Nam-chol		(substituted off) 58'
LM	10	Hong Yong-jo (c)	(yellow card) 47'
CF	9	Jong Tae-se
Substitutions:
FW	6	Kim Kum-il		(substituted on) 58'
MF	15	Kim Yong-jun		(substituted on) 58'
DF	16	Nam Song-chol		(substituted on) 75'
Manager:
Kim Jong-hun

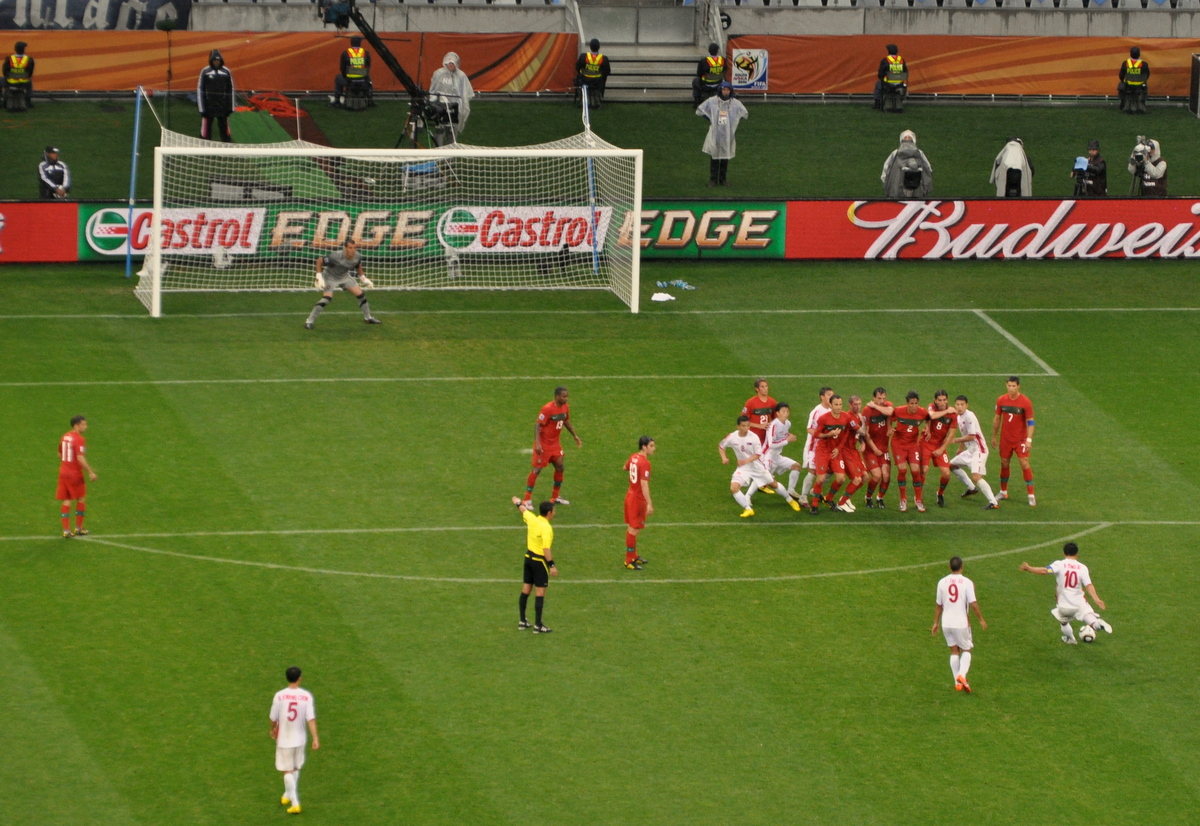
Portugal vs North Korea

Man of the Match:
Cristiano Ronaldo (Portugal)

Assistant referees:
Patricio Basualto (Chile)
Francisco Mondria (Chile)
Fourth official:
Jerome Damon (South Africa)
Fifth official:
Enock Molefe (South Africa)

=== Portugal vs Brazil ===
25 June 2010
16:00

Portugal	0–0	Brazil

Moses Mabhida Stadium, Durban
Attendance: 62,712
Referee: Benito Archundia (Mexico)

Portugal	Brazil

GK	1	Eduardo
RB	21	Ricardo Costa
CB	6	Ricardo Carvalho
CB	2	Bruno Alves
LB	5	Duda	(yellow card) 25'	(substituted off) 54'
DM	15	Pepe	(yellow card) 40'	(substituted off) 64'
CM	19	Tiago	(yellow card) 31'
CM	16	Raul Meireles		(substituted off) 84'
RW	10	Danny
LW	23	Fábio Coentrão	(yellow card) 45'
CF	7	Cristiano Ronaldo (c)
Substitutions:
MF	11	Simão		(substituted on) 54'
MF	8	Pedro Mendes		(substituted on) 64'
MF	14	Miguel Veloso		(substituted on) 84'
Manager:
Carlos Queiroz

GK	1	Júlio César
RB	2	Maicon
CB	3	Lúcio (c)
CB	4	Juan	(yellow card) 25'
LB	6	Michel Bastos
DM	8	Gilberto Silva
RM	13	Dani Alves
LM	5	Felipe Melo	(yellow card) 43'	(substituted off) 44'
RF	21	Nilmar
CF	19	Júlio Baptista		(substituted off) 82'
LF	9	Luís Fabiano	(yellow card) 15'	(substituted off) 85'
Substitutions:
MF	17	Josué		(substituted on) 44'
MF	18	Ramires		(substituted on) 82'
FW	23	Grafite		(substituted on) 85'
Manager:
Dunga

Man of the Match:
Cristiano Ronaldo (Portugal)

Assistant referees:
Héctor Vergara (Canada)
Marvin Torrentera (Mexico)
Fourth official:
Peter O'Leary (New Zealand)
Fifth official:
Brent Best (New Zealand)

=== North Korea vs Ivory Coast ===
25 June 2010
16:00

North Korea	0–3	Ivory Coast
		Y. Touré 14'; Romaric 20'; Kalou 82'

Mbombela Stadium, Nelspruit
Attendance: 34,763
Referee: Alberto Undiano Mallenco (Spain)

North Korea	Ivory Coast

GK	1	Ri Myong-guk
SW	3	Ri Jun-il
RB	2	Cha Jong-hyok
CB	13	Pak Chol-jin
CB	8	Ji Yun-nam
LB	5	Ri Kwang-chon
RM	10	Hong Yong-jo (c)
CM	17	An Yong-hak
CM	4	Pak Nam-chol
LM	11	Mun In-guk	(substituted off) 67'
CF	9	Jong Tae-se
Substitutions:
FW	12	Choe Kum-chol	(substituted on) 67'
Manager:
Kim Jong-hun

GK	1	Boubacar Barry
RB	21	Emmanuel Eboué
CB	4	Kolo Touré
CB	5	Didier Zokora
LB	3	Arthur Boka
DM	19	Yaya Touré
CM	13	Romaric	(substituted off) 79'
CM	9	Cheick Tioté
RW	18	Kader Keïta	(substituted off) 64'
LW	10	Gervinho	(substituted off) 64'
CF	11	Didier Drogba (c)
Substitutions:
FW	8	Salomon Kalou	(substituted on) 64'
FW	15	Aruna Dindane	(substituted on) 64'
FW	7	Seydou Doumbia	(substituted on) 79'
Manager:
(Sweden) Sven-Göran Eriksson

Man of the Match:
Didier Drogba (Ivory Coast)

Assistant referees:
Fermín Martínez Ibánez (Spain)
Juan Carlos Yuste Jiménez (Spain)
Fourth official:
Massimo Busacca (Switzerland)
Fifth official:
Matthias Arnet (Switzerland)

== See also ==
- Brazil at the FIFA World Cup
- Ivory Coast at the FIFA World Cup
- North Korea at the FIFA World Cup
- Portugal at the FIFA World Cup
