= 2010 FIFA World Cup squads =

The 2010 FIFA World Cup was an international football tournament held in South Africa from 11 June until 11 July 2010. The 32 national teams involved in the tournament were required to register a squad of 23 players; only players in these squads were eligible to take part in the tournament.

Before announcing their final squad for the tournament, teams were required to name a preliminary squad of 30 players by 11 May 2010, 30 days before the start of the tournament. With the exception of those involved in the 2010 UEFA Champions League Final, the players listed in the preliminary squad were then subjected to a mandatory rest period from 17 to 23 May 2010. The preliminary squad would then have to be cut to a final 23 by 1 June 2010 (midnight CET). Replacement of seriously injured players is permitted until 24 hours before the team in question's first World Cup game, though replacement players do not have to be drawn from the preliminary squad.

Players marked (c) were named as captain for their national squad. Number of caps, players' club teams and players' age as of 11 June 2010, the tournament's opening day.

For the first time in World Cup history, all teams had at least one player from a European club (North Korea being the only team with just one, Hong Yong-jo). Three national squads were made up entirely of players from domestic clubs: England, Italy and Germany. Nigeria was the only team with no players from domestic clubs.

== Group A ==
=== France ===
Coach: Raymond Domenech

No.	Pos.	Player	Date of birth (age)	Caps	Club
1	GK	Hugo Lloris	26 December 1986 (aged 23)	11	(France) Lyon
2	DF	Bacary Sagna	14 February 1983 (aged 27)	20	(England) Arsenal
3	DF	Eric Abidal	11 September 1979 (aged 30)	48	(Spain) Barcelona
4	DF	Anthony Réveillère	10 November 1979 (aged 30)	6	(France) Lyon
5	DF	William Gallas	17 August 1977 (aged 32)	81	(England) Arsenal
6	DF	Marc Planus	7 March 1982 (aged 28)	1	(France) Bordeaux
7	MF	Franck Ribéry	7 April 1983 (aged 27)	45	(Germany) Bayern Munich
8	MF	Yoann Gourcuff	11 July 1986 (aged 23)	20	(France) Bordeaux
9	FW	Djibril Cissé	12 August 1981 (aged 28)	39	(Greece) Panathinaikos
10	FW	Sidney Govou	27 July 1979 (aged 30)	46	(France) Lyon
11	FW	André-Pierre Gignac	5 December 1985 (aged 24)	13	(France) Toulouse
12	FW	Thierry Henry (c)	17 August 1977 (aged 32)	121	(Spain) Barcelona
13	DF	Patrice Evra	15 May 1981 (aged 29)	30	(England) Manchester United
14	MF	Jérémy Toulalan	10 September 1983 (aged 26)	34	(France) Lyon
15	MF	Florent Malouda	13 June 1980 (aged 29)	54	(England) Chelsea
16	GK	Steve Mandanda	28 March 1985 (aged 25)	13	(France) Marseille
17	DF	Sébastien Squillaci	11 August 1980 (aged 29)	20	(Spain) Sevilla
18	MF	Alou Diarra	15 July 1981 (aged 28)	25	(France) Bordeaux
19	MF	Abou Diaby	11 May 1986 (aged 24)	5	(England) Arsenal
20	MF	Mathieu Valbuena	28 September 1984 (aged 25)	2	(France) Marseille
21	FW	Nicolas Anelka	14 March 1979 (aged 31)	67	(England) Chelsea
22	DF	Gaël Clichy	26 July 1985 (aged 24)	4	(England) Arsenal
23	GK	Cédric Carrasso	30 December 1981 (aged 28)	0	(France) Bordeaux

=== Mexico ===
Coach: Javier Aguirre

No.	Pos.	Player	Date of birth (age)	Caps	Club
1	GK	Óscar Pérez	1 February 1973 (aged 37)	52	(Mexico) Chiapas
2	DF	Francisco Javier Rodríguez	20 October 1981 (aged 28)	48	(Netherlands) PSV Eindhoven
3	DF	Carlos Salcido	2 April 1980 (aged 30)	73	(Netherlands) PSV Eindhoven
4	DF	Rafael Márquez	13 February 1979 (aged 31)	91	(Spain) Barcelona
5	DF	Ricardo Osorio	30 March 1980 (aged 30)	76	(Germany) VfB Stuttgart
6	MF	Gerardo Torrado	30 April 1979 (aged 31)	114	(Mexico) Cruz Azul
7	MF	Pablo Barrera	21 June 1987 (aged 22)	21	(Mexico) Pumas UNAM
8	MF	Israel Castro	29 December 1980 (aged 29)	31	(Mexico) Pumas UNAM
9	FW	Guillermo Franco	3 November 1976 (aged 33)	21	(England) West Ham United
10	FW	Cuauhtémoc Blanco (c)	17 January 1973 (aged 37)	115	(Mexico) Veracruz
11	FW	Carlos Vela	1 March 1989 (aged 21)	28	(England) Arsenal
12	DF	Paul Aguilar	6 March 1986 (aged 24)	10	(Mexico) Pachuca
13	GK	Guillermo Ochoa	13 July 1985 (aged 24)	37	(Mexico) América
14	FW	Javier Hernández	1 June 1988 (aged 22)	12	(Mexico) Guadalajara
15	DF	Héctor Moreno	17 January 1988 (aged 22)	10	(Netherlands) AZ
16	DF	Efraín Juárez	22 February 1988 (aged 22)	19	(Mexico) Pumas UNAM
17	FW	Giovani dos Santos	11 May 1989 (aged 21)	26	(Turkey) Galatasaray
18	MF	Andrés Guardado	28 September 1986 (aged 23)	56	(Spain) Deportivo La Coruña
19	DF	Jonny Magallón	21 November 1981 (aged 28)	52	(Mexico) Guadalajara
20	DF	Jorge Torres Nilo	16 January 1988 (aged 22)	8	(Mexico) Atlas
21	FW	Adolfo Bautista	15 May 1979 (aged 31)	37	(Mexico) Guadalajara
22	MF	Alberto Medina	29 May 1983 (aged 27)	56	(Mexico) Guadalajara
23	GK	Luis Ernesto Michel	21 July 1979 (aged 30)	4	(Mexico) Guadalajara

=== South Africa ===
Coach: (Brazil) Carlos Alberto Parreira

No.	Pos.	Player	Date of birth (age)	Caps	Club
1	GK	Moeneeb Josephs	19 May 1980 (aged 30)	17	(South Africa) Orlando Pirates
2	DF	Siboniso Gaxa	6 April 1984 (aged 26)	37	(South Africa) Mamelodi Sundowns
3	DF	Tsepo Masilela	5 May 1985 (aged 25)	31	(Israel) Maccabi Haifa
4	DF	Aaron Mokoena (c)	25 November 1980 (aged 29)	101	(England) Portsmouth
5	DF	Anele Ngcongca	20 October 1987 (aged 22)	5	(Belgium) Genk
6	MF	MacBeth Sibaya	25 November 1977 (aged 32)	58	(Russia) Rubin Kazan
7	MF	Lance Davids	11 April 1985 (aged 25)	22	(South Africa) Ajax Cape Town
8	MF	Siphiwe Tshabalala	25 September 1984 (aged 25)	48	(South Africa) Kaizer Chiefs
9	FW	Katlego Mphela	29 November 1984 (aged 25)	31	(South Africa) Mamelodi Sundowns
10	MF	Steven Pienaar	17 March 1982 (aged 28)	50	(England) Everton
11	MF	Teko Modise	22 December 1982 (aged 27)	52	(South Africa) Orlando Pirates
12	MF	Reneilwe Letsholonyane	9 June 1982 (aged 28)	13	(South Africa) Kaizer Chiefs
13	MF	Kagisho Dikgacoi	24 November 1984 (aged 25)	37	(England) Fulham
14	DF	Matthew Booth	14 March 1977 (aged 33)	27	(South Africa) Mamelodi Sundowns
15	DF	Lucas Thwala	19 October 1981 (aged 28)	24	(South Africa) Orlando Pirates
16	GK	Itumeleng Khune	20 June 1987 (aged 22)	27	(South Africa) Kaizer Chiefs
17	FW	Bernard Parker	16 March 1986 (aged 24)	28	(Netherlands) Twente
18	FW	Siyabonga Nomvethe	2 December 1977 (aged 32)	76	(South Africa) Moroka Swallows
19	MF	Surprise Moriri	20 March 1980 (aged 30)	34	(South Africa) Mamelodi Sundowns
20	DF	Bongani Khumalo	6 January 1987 (aged 23)	14	(South Africa) Supersport United
21	DF	Siyabonga Sangweni	29 September 1981 (aged 28)	8	(South Africa) Golden Arrows
22	GK	Shu-Aib Walters	26 December 1981 (aged 28)	0	(South Africa) Maritzburg United
23	MF	Thanduyise Khuboni	23 May 1986 (aged 24)	9	(South Africa) Golden Arrows

=== Uruguay ===
Coach: Óscar Tabárez

No.	Pos.	Player	Date of birth (age)	Caps	Club
1	GK	Fernando Muslera	16 June 1986 (aged 23)	6	(Italy) Lazio
2	DF	Diego Lugano (c)	2 November 1980 (aged 29)	42	(Turkey) Fenerbahçe
3	DF	Diego Godín	16 February 1986 (aged 24)	38	(Spain) Villarreal
4	DF	Jorge Fucile	19 November 1984 (aged 25)	24	(Portugal) Porto
5	MF	Walter Gargano	23 July 1984 (aged 25)	28	(Italy) Napoli
6	DF	Mauricio Victorino	11 October 1982 (aged 27)	4	Universidad de Chile
7	FW	Edinson Cavani	14 February 1987 (aged 23)	14	(Italy) Palermo
8	MF	Sebastián Eguren	8 January 1981 (aged 29)	27	(Sweden) AIK
9	FW	Luis Suárez	24 January 1987 (aged 23)	30	(Netherlands) Ajax
10	FW	Diego Forlán	19 May 1979 (aged 31)	62	(Spain) Atlético Madrid
11	DF	Álvaro Pereira	28 November 1985 (aged 24)	15	(Portugal) Porto
12	GK	Juan Castillo	17 April 1978 (aged 32)	11	(Colombia) Deportivo Cali
13	FW	Sebastián Abreu	17 October 1976 (aged 33)	56	(Brazil) Botafogo
14	MF	Nicolás Lodeiro	21 March 1989 (aged 21)	4	(Netherlands) Ajax
15	MF	Diego Pérez	18 May 1980 (aged 30)	50	(France) Monaco
16	DF	Maxi Pereira	8 June 1984 (aged 26)	37	(Portugal) Benfica
17	MF	Egidio Arévalo Ríos	1 January 1982 (aged 28)	6	(Uruguay) Peñarol
18	MF	Ignacio González	14 May 1982 (aged 28)	17	(Greece) Levadiakos
19	DF	Andrés Scotti	14 December 1975 (aged 34)	26	(Chile) Colo-Colo
20	MF	Álvaro Fernández	11 October 1985 (aged 24)	7	Universidad de Chile
21	FW	Sebastián Fernández	23 May 1985 (aged 25)	6	(Argentina) Banfield
22	DF	Martín Cáceres	7 April 1987 (aged 23)	19	(Italy) Juventus
23	GK	Martín Silva	25 March 1983 (aged 27)	1	(Uruguay) Defensor Sporting

== Group B ==
=== Argentina ===
Coach: Diego Maradona

No.	Pos.	Player	Date of birth (age)	Caps	Club
1	GK	Diego Pozo	16 February 1978 (aged 32)	3	(Argentina) Colón
2	DF	Martín Demichelis	20 December 1980 (aged 29)	25	(Germany) Bayern Munich
3	DF	Clemente Rodríguez	31 July 1981 (aged 28)	12	(Argentina) Estudiantes
4	DF	Nicolás Burdisso	12 April 1981 (aged 29)	29	(Italy) Roma
5	MF	Mario Bolatti	17 February 1985 (aged 25)	5	(Italy) Fiorentina
6	DF	Gabriel Heinze	19 April 1978 (aged 32)	64	(France) Marseille
7	MF	Ángel Di María	14 February 1988 (aged 22)	8	(Portugal) Benfica
8	MF	Juan Sebastián Verón	9 March 1975 (aged 35)	70	(Argentina) Estudiantes
9	FW	Gonzalo Higuaín	10 December 1987 (aged 22)	5	(Spain) Real Madrid
10	FW	Lionel Messi	24 June 1987 (aged 22)	45	(Spain) Barcelona
11	FW	Carlos Tevez	5 February 1984 (aged 26)	54	(England) Manchester City
12	DF	Ariel Garcé	14 July 1979 (aged 30)	4	(Argentina) Colón
13	DF	Walter Samuel	23 March 1978 (aged 32)	54	(Italy) Inter Milan
14	MF	Javier Mascherano (c)	8 June 1984 (aged 26)	57	(England) Liverpool
15	DF	Nicolás Otamendi	12 February 1988 (aged 22)	7	(Argentina) Vélez Sársfield
16	FW	Sergio Agüero	2 June 1988 (aged 22)	22	(Spain) Atlético Madrid
17	MF	Jonás Gutiérrez	5 July 1983 (aged 26)	16	(England) Newcastle United
18	FW	Martín Palermo	7 November 1973 (aged 36)	14	(Argentina) Boca Juniors
19	FW	Diego Milito	12 June 1979 (aged 30)	21	(Italy) Inter Milan
20	MF	Maxi Rodríguez	2 January 1981 (aged 29)	36	(England) Liverpool
21	GK	Mariano Andújar	30 July 1983 (aged 26)	4	(Italy) Catania
22	GK	Sergio Romero	22 February 1987 (aged 23)	6	(Netherlands) AZ
23	MF	Javier Pastore	20 June 1989 (aged 20)	1	(Italy) Palermo

=== Greece ===
Coach: (Germany) Otto Rehhagel

No.	Pos.	Player	Date of birth (age)	Caps	Club
1	GK	Kostas Chalkias	30 May 1974 (aged 36)	27	(Greece) PAOK
2	DF	Giourkas Seitaridis	4 June 1981 (aged 29)	69	(Greece) Panathinaikos
3	DF	Christos Patsatzoglou	19 March 1979 (aged 31)	43	(Cyprus) Omonia
4	DF	Nikos Spyropoulos	10 October 1983 (aged 26)	19	(Greece) Panathinaikos
5	DF	Vangelis Moras	18 August 1981 (aged 28)	11	(Italy) Bologna
6	MF	Alexandros Tziolis	13 February 1985 (aged 25)	19	(Italy) Siena
7	FW	Georgios Samaras	21 February 1985 (aged 25)	34	(Scotland) Celtic
8	DF	Avraam Papadopoulos	3 December 1984 (aged 25)	14	(Greece) Olympiacos
9	FW	Angelos Charisteas	9 February 1980 (aged 30)	84	(Germany) 1. FC Nürnberg
10	MF	Giorgos Karagounis (c)	6 March 1977 (aged 33)	93	(Greece) Panathinaikos
11	DF	Loukas Vyntra	5 February 1981 (aged 29)	29	(Greece) Panathinaikos
12	GK	Alexandros Tzorvas	12 August 1982 (aged 27)	8	(Greece) Panathinaikos
13	GK	Michalis Sifakis	9 September 1984 (aged 25)	2	(Greece) Aris
14	FW	Dimitris Salpingidis	18 August 1981 (aged 28)	36	(Greece) Panathinaikos
15	DF	Vasilis Torosidis	10 June 1985 (aged 25)	26	(Greece) Olympiacos
16	DF	Sotirios Kyrgiakos	23 July 1979 (aged 30)	58	(England) Liverpool
17	FW	Theofanis Gekas	23 May 1980 (aged 30)	47	(Germany) Hertha BSC
18	MF	Sotiris Ninis	3 April 1990 (aged 20)	4	(Greece) Panathinaikos
19	DF	Sokratis Papastathopoulos	9 June 1988 (aged 22)	10	(Italy) Genoa
20	FW	Pantelis Kapetanos	8 June 1983 (aged 27)	3	(Romania) FCSB
21	MF	Kostas Katsouranis	21 June 1979 (aged 30)	69	(Greece) Panathinaikos
22	DF	Stelios Malezas	11 March 1985 (aged 25)	0	(Greece) PAOK
23	MF	Sakis Prittas	9 January 1979 (aged 31)	0	(Greece) Aris

=== Nigeria ===
Coach: (Sweden) Lars Lagerbäck

No.	Pos.	Player	Date of birth (age)	Caps	Club
1	GK	Vincent Enyeama	29 August 1982 (aged 27)	51	(Israel) Hapoel Tel Aviv
2	DF	Joseph Yobo	6 September 1980 (aged 29)	64	(England) Everton
3	DF	Taye Taiwo	16 April 1985 (aged 25)	35	(France) Marseille
4	FW	Nwankwo Kanu (c)	1 August 1976 (aged 33)	72	(England) Portsmouth
5	DF	Rabiu Afolabi	18 April 1980 (aged 30)	12	(Austria) Red Bull Salzburg
6	DF	Danny Shittu	2 September 1980 (aged 29)	23	(England) Bolton Wanderers
7	FW	John Utaka	8 January 1982 (aged 28)	41	(England) Portsmouth
8	FW	Yakubu	22 November 1982 (aged 27)	47	(England) Everton
9	FW	Obafemi Martins	28 October 1984 (aged 25)	27	(Germany) VfL Wolfsburg
10	FW	Brown Ideye	10 October 1988 (aged 21)	0	(France) Sochaux
11	FW	Peter Odemwingie	15 July 1981 (aged 28)	43	(Russia) Lokomotiv Moscow
12	FW	Kalu Uche	15 November 1982 (aged 27)	18	(Spain) Almería
13	MF	Ayila Yussuf	4 November 1984 (aged 25)	24	(Ukraine) Dynamo Kyiv
14	MF	Sani Kaita	2 May 1986 (aged 24)	16	(Russia) Alania Vladikavkaz
15	MF	Lukman Haruna	4 December 1990 (aged 19)	5	(France) Monaco
16	GK	Austin Ejide	8 April 1984 (aged 26)	16	(Israel) Hapoel Petah Tikva
17	DF	Chidi Odiah	17 December 1983 (aged 26)	21	(Russia) CSKA Moscow
18	FW	Victor Obinna	25 March 1987 (aged 23)	30	(Spain) Málaga
19	FW	Chinedu Obasi	1 June 1986 (aged 24)	17	(Germany) 1899 Hoffenheim
20	MF	Dickson Etuhu	8 June 1982 (aged 28)	11	(England) Fulham
21	DF	Elderson Echiéjilé	20 January 1988 (aged 22)	9	(France) Rennes
22	DF	Dele Adeleye	25 December 1988 (aged 21)	5	(Netherlands) Sparta Rotterdam
23	GK	Dele Aiyenugba	20 November 1983 (aged 26)	9	(Israel) Bnei Yehuda

=== South Korea ===
Coach: Huh Jung-moo

No.	Pos.	Player	Date of birth (age)	Caps	Club
1	GK	Lee Woon-jae	26 April 1973 (aged 37)	130	(South Korea) Suwon Samsung Bluewings
2	DF	Oh Beom-seok	29 July 1984 (aged 25)	37	(South Korea) Ulsan Hyundai
3	DF	Kim Hyung-il	27 April 1984 (aged 26)	2	(South Korea) Pohang Steelers
4	DF	Cho Yong-hyung	3 November 1983 (aged 26)	31	(South Korea) Jeju United
5	MF	Kim Nam-il	14 March 1977 (aged 33)	92	(Russia) Tom Tomsk
6	MF	Kim Bo-kyung	6 October 1989 (aged 20)	6	(Japan) Oita Trinita
7	MF	Park Ji-sung (c)	30 March 1981 (aged 29)	88	(England) Manchester United
8	MF	Kim Jung-woo	9 May 1982 (aged 28)	54	(South Korea) Gwangju Sangmu
9	FW	Ahn Jung-hwan	27 January 1976 (aged 34)	70	(China) Dalian Shide
10	FW	Park Chu-young	10 July 1985 (aged 24)	40	(France) Monaco
11	FW	Lee Seung-yeoul	6 March 1989 (aged 21)	8	(South Korea) FC Seoul
12	DF	Lee Young-pyo	23 April 1977 (aged 33)	112	(Saudi Arabia) Al Hilal
13	MF	Kim Jae-sung	3 October 1983 (aged 26)	7	(South Korea) Pohang Steelers
14	DF	Lee Jung-soo	8 January 1980 (aged 30)	24	(Japan) Kashima Antlers
15	DF	Kim Dong-jin	29 January 1982 (aged 28)	61	(South Korea) Ulsan Hyundai
16	MF	Ki Sung-yueng	24 January 1989 (aged 21)	21	(Scotland) Celtic
17	FW	Lee Chung-yong	2 July 1988 (aged 21)	23	(England) Bolton Wanderers
18	GK	Jung Sung-ryong	4 January 1985 (aged 25)	15	(South Korea) Seongnam Ilhwa Chunma
19	FW	Yeom Ki-hun	30 March 1983 (aged 27)	33	(South Korea) Suwon Samsung Bluewings
20	FW	Lee Dong-gook	29 April 1979 (aged 31)	83	(South Korea) Jeonbuk Hyundai Motors
21	GK	Kim Young-kwang	28 June 1983 (aged 26)	14	(South Korea) Ulsan Hyundai
22	DF	Cha Du-ri	25 July 1980 (aged 29)	46	(Germany) SC Freiburg
23	DF	Kang Min-soo	14 February 1986 (aged 24)	31	(South Korea) Suwon Samsung Bluewings

== Group C ==
=== Algeria ===
Coach: Rabah Saâdane

No.	Pos.	Player	Date of birth (age)	Caps	Club
1	GK	Lounès Gaouaoui	28 September 1977 (aged 32)	48	(Algeria) ASO Chlef
2	DF	Madjid Bougherra	7 October 1982 (aged 27)	41	(Scotland) Rangers
3	DF	Nadir Belhadj	18 June 1982 (aged 27)	45	(England) Portsmouth
4	DF	Antar Yahia (c)	21 March 1982 (aged 28)	44	(Germany) VfL Bochum
5	DF	Rafik Halliche	2 September 1986 (aged 23)	17	(Portugal) Nacional
6	MF	Yazid Mansouri	25 February 1978 (aged 32)	67	(France) Lorient
7	MF	Ryad Boudebouz	19 February 1990 (aged 20)	2	(France) Sochaux
8	MF	Mehdi Lacen	5 January 1984 (aged 26)	3	(Spain) Racing Santander
9	FW	Abdelkader Ghezzal	5 December 1984 (aged 25)	19	(Italy) Siena
10	FW	Rafik Saïfi	7 February 1975 (aged 35)	62	(France) Istres
11	FW	Rafik Djebbour	8 March 1984 (aged 26)	16	(Greece) AEK Athens
12	DF	Habib Bellaïd	28 March 1986 (aged 24)	1	(Germany) Eintracht Frankfurt
13	FW	Karim Matmour	25 June 1985 (aged 24)	23	(Germany) Borussia Mönchengladbach
14	DF	Abdelkader Laïfaoui	29 July 1981 (aged 28)	7	(Algeria) ES Sétif
15	MF	Karim Ziani	17 August 1982 (aged 27)	55	(Germany) VfL Wolfsburg
16	GK	Faouzi Chaouchi	5 December 1984 (aged 25)	10	(Algeria) ES Sétif
17	MF	Adlène Guedioura	12 November 1985 (aged 24)	2	(England) Wolverhampton Wanderers
18	DF	Carl Medjani	15 May 1985 (aged 25)	0	(France) Ajaccio
19	MF	Hassan Yebda	14 April 1984 (aged 26)	9	(England) Portsmouth
20	DF	Djamel Mesbah	9 October 1984 (aged 25)	1	(Italy) Lecce
21	MF	Foued Kadir	5 December 1983 (aged 26)	2	(France) Valenciennes
22	MF	Djamel Abdoun	14 February 1986 (aged 24)	7	(France) Nantes
23	GK	Raïs M'Bolhi	25 April 1986 (aged 24)	1	(Bulgaria) Slavia Sofia

=== England ===
Coach: (Italy) Fabio Capello

No.	Pos.	Player	Date of birth (age)	Caps	Club
1	GK	David James	1 August 1970 (aged 39)	50	(England) Portsmouth
2	DF	Glen Johnson	23 August 1984 (aged 25)	22	(England) Liverpool
3	DF	Ashley Cole	20 December 1980 (aged 29)	78	(England) Chelsea
4	MF	Steven Gerrard (c)	30 May 1980 (aged 30)	80	(England) Liverpool
5	DF	Michael Dawson	18 November 1983 (aged 26)	0	(England) Tottenham Hotspur
6	DF	John Terry	7 December 1980 (aged 29)	60	(England) Chelsea
7	MF	Aaron Lennon	16 April 1987 (aged 23)	17	(England) Tottenham Hotspur
8	MF	Frank Lampard	20 June 1978 (aged 31)	78	(England) Chelsea
9	FW	Peter Crouch	30 January 1981 (aged 29)	38	(England) Tottenham Hotspur
10	FW	Wayne Rooney	24 October 1985 (aged 24)	60	(England) Manchester United
11	MF	Joe Cole	8 November 1981 (aged 28)	54	(England) Chelsea
12	GK	Robert Green	18 January 1980 (aged 30)	10	(England) West Ham United
13	DF	Stephen Warnock	12 December 1981 (aged 28)	1	(England) Aston Villa
14	MF	Gareth Barry	23 February 1981 (aged 29)	36	(England) Manchester City
15	DF	Matthew Upson	18 April 1979 (aged 31)	19	(England) West Ham United
16	MF	James Milner	4 January 1986 (aged 24)	8	(England) Aston Villa
17	MF	Shaun Wright-Phillips	25 October 1981 (aged 28)	31	(England) Manchester City
18	DF	Jamie Carragher	28 January 1978 (aged 32)	36	(England) Liverpool
19	FW	Jermain Defoe	7 October 1982 (aged 27)	39	(England) Tottenham Hotspur
20	DF	Ledley King	12 October 1980 (aged 29)	20	(England) Tottenham Hotspur
21	FW	Emile Heskey	11 January 1978 (aged 32)	58	(England) Aston Villa
22	MF	Michael Carrick	28 July 1981 (aged 28)	22	(England) Manchester United
23	GK	Joe Hart	19 April 1987 (aged 23)	3	(England) Birmingham City

=== Slovenia ===
Coach: Matjaž Kek

No.	Pos.	Player	Date of birth (age)	Caps	Club
1	GK	Samir Handanović	14 July 1984 (aged 25)	39	(Italy) Udinese
2	DF	Mišo Brečko	1 May 1984 (aged 26)	31	(Germany) 1. FC Köln
3	DF	Elvedin Džinić	25 August 1985 (aged 24)	0	(Slovenia) Maribor
4	DF	Marko Šuler	9 March 1983 (aged 27)	17	(Belgium) Gent
5	DF	Boštjan Cesar	9 July 1982 (aged 27)	43	(France) Grenoble
6	DF	Branko Ilić	6 February 1983 (aged 27)	37	(Russia) Lokomotiv Moscow
7	FW	Nejc Pečnik	3 January 1986 (aged 24)	8	(Portugal) Nacional
8	MF	Robert Koren (c)	20 September 1980 (aged 29)	46	(England) West Bromwich Albion
9	FW	Zlatan Ljubijankić	15 December 1983 (aged 26)	17	(Belgium) Gent
10	FW	Valter Birsa	7 August 1986 (aged 23)	34	(France) Auxerre
11	FW	Milivoje Novaković	18 May 1979 (aged 31)	38	(Germany) 1. FC Köln
12	GK	Jasmin Handanović	28 January 1978 (aged 32)	3	(Italy) Mantova
13	DF	Bojan Jokić	17 May 1986 (aged 24)	34	(Italy) Chievo
14	FW	Zlatko Dedić	10 May 1984 (aged 26)	24	(Germany) VfL Bochum
15	MF	Rene Krhin	21 May 1990 (aged 20)	4	(Italy) Inter Milan
16	GK	Aleksander Šeliga	1 February 1980 (aged 30)	1	(Netherlands) Sparta Rotterdam
17	MF	Andraž Kirm	6 September 1984 (aged 25)	26	(Poland) Wisła Kraków
18	MF	Aleksandar Radosavljević	25 April 1979 (aged 31)	15	(Greece) AEL
19	DF	Suad Fileković	16 September 1978 (aged 31)	14	(Slovenia) Maribor
20	MF	Andrej Komac	4 December 1979 (aged 30)	41	(Israel) Maccabi Tel Aviv
21	MF	Dalibor Stevanović	27 September 1984 (aged 25)	15	(Netherlands) Vitesse
22	DF	Matej Mavrič	29 January 1979 (aged 31)	32	(Germany) TuS Koblenz
23	FW	Tim Matavž	13 January 1989 (aged 21)	1	(Netherlands) Groningen

=== United States ===
Coach: Bob Bradley

No.	Pos.	Player	Date of birth (age)	Caps	Club
1	GK	Tim Howard	6 March 1979 (aged 31)	51	(England) Everton
2	DF	Jonathan Spector	1 March 1986 (aged 24)	25	(England) West Ham United
3	DF	Carlos Bocanegra (c)	25 May 1979 (aged 31)	79	(France) Rennes
4	MF	Michael Bradley	31 July 1987 (aged 22)	43	(Germany) Borussia Mönchengladbach
5	DF	Oguchi Onyewu	13 May 1982 (aged 28)	54	(Italy) Milan
6	DF	Steve Cherundolo	19 February 1979 (aged 31)	60	(Germany) Hannover 96
7	MF	DaMarcus Beasley	24 May 1982 (aged 28)	92	(Scotland) Rangers
8	MF	Clint Dempsey	9 March 1983 (aged 27)	62	(England) Fulham
9	FW	Herculez Gomez	6 April 1982 (aged 28)	4	(Mexico) Puebla
10	MF	Landon Donovan	4 March 1982 (aged 28)	123	(United States) LA Galaxy
11	MF	Stuart Holden	1 August 1985 (aged 24)	14	(England) Bolton Wanderers
12	DF	Jonathan Bornstein	7 November 1984 (aged 25)	32	(United States) Chivas USA
13	MF	Ricardo Clark	10 March 1983 (aged 27)	29	(Germany) Eintracht Frankfurt
14	FW	Edson Buddle	21 May 1981 (aged 29)	3	(United States) LA Galaxy
15	DF	Jay DeMerit	4 December 1979 (aged 30)	19	(England) Watford
16	MF	José Francisco Torres	29 October 1987 (aged 22)	10	(Mexico) Pachuca
17	FW	Jozy Altidore	6 November 1989 (aged 20)	25	(England) Hull City
18	GK	Brad Guzan	9 September 1984 (aged 25)	16	(England) Aston Villa
19	MF	Maurice Edu	18 April 1986 (aged 24)	13	(Scotland) Rangers
20	FW	Robbie Findley	4 August 1985 (aged 24)	6	(United States) Real Salt Lake
21	DF	Clarence Goodson	17 May 1982 (aged 28)	14	(Norway) Start
22	MF	Benny Feilhaber	19 January 1985 (aged 25)	32	(Denmark) AGF
23	GK	Marcus Hahnemann	15 June 1972 (aged 37)	7	(England) Wolverhampton Wanderers

== Group D ==
=== Australia ===
Coach: (Netherlands) Pim Verbeek

No.	Pos.	Player	Date of birth (age)	Caps	Club
1	GK	Mark Schwarzer	6 October 1972 (aged 37)	75	(England) Fulham
2	DF	Lucas Neill (c)	9 March 1978 (aged 32)	56	(Turkey) Galatasaray
3	DF	Craig Moore	12 December 1975 (aged 34)	50	(Greece) Kavala
4	MF	Tim Cahill	6 December 1979 (aged 30)	40	(England) Everton
5	MF	Jason Culina	5 August 1980 (aged 29)	49	(Australia) Gold Coast United
6	DF	Michael Beauchamp	8 March 1981 (aged 29)	21	(United Arab Emirates) Al Jazira
7	MF	Brett Emerton	22 February 1979 (aged 31)	72	(England) Blackburn Rovers
8	DF	Luke Wilkshire	1 October 1981 (aged 28)	42	(Russia) Dynamo Moscow
9	FW	Joshua Kennedy	20 August 1982 (aged 27)	19	(Japan) Nagoya Grampus
10	FW	Harry Kewell	22 September 1978 (aged 31)	45	(Turkey) Galatasaray
11	DF	Scott Chipperfield	30 December 1975 (aged 34)	65	(Switzerland) Basel
12	GK	Adam Federici	31 January 1985 (aged 25)	1	(England) Reading
13	MF	Vince Grella	5 October 1979 (aged 30)	45	(England) Blackburn Rovers
14	FW	Brett Holman	27 March 1984 (aged 26)	31	(Netherlands) AZ
15	MF	Mile Jedinak	3 August 1984 (aged 25)	11	(Turkey) Antalyaspor
16	MF	Carl Valeri	14 August 1984 (aged 25)	22	(Italy) Sassuolo
17	FW	Nikita Rukavytsya	22 June 1987 (aged 22)	3	(Belgium) Roeselare
18	GK	Eugene Galekovic	12 June 1981 (aged 28)	4	(Australia) Adelaide United
19	MF	Richard Garcia	4 September 1981 (aged 28)	7	(England) Hull City
20	DF	Mark Milligan	4 September 1985 (aged 24)	10	(Japan) JEF United
21	DF	David Carney	30 November 1983 (aged 26)	25	(Netherlands) Twente
22	MF	Dario Vidošić	12 April 1987 (aged 23)	7	(Germany) MSV Duisburg
23	MF	Mark Bresciano	11 February 1980 (aged 30)	55	(Italy) Palermo

=== Germany ===
Coach: Joachim Löw

No.	Pos.	Player	Date of birth (age)	Caps	Club
1	GK	Manuel Neuer	27 March 1986 (aged 24)	5	(Germany) Schalke 04
2	MF	Marcell Jansen	4 November 1985 (aged 24)	31	(Germany) Hamburger SV
3	DF	Arne Friedrich	29 May 1979 (aged 31)	72	(Germany) Hertha BSC
4	DF	Dennis Aogo	14 January 1987 (aged 23)	2	(Germany) Hamburger SV
5	DF	Serdar Tasci	24 April 1987 (aged 23)	12	(Germany) VfB Stuttgart
6	MF	Sami Khedira	4 April 1987 (aged 23)	5	(Germany) VfB Stuttgart
7	MF	Bastian Schweinsteiger	1 August 1984 (aged 25)	74	(Germany) Bayern Munich
8	MF	Mesut Özil	15 October 1988 (aged 21)	10	(Germany) Werder Bremen
9	FW	Stefan Kießling	25 January 1984 (aged 26)	4	(Germany) Bayer Leverkusen
10	MF	Lukas Podolski	4 June 1985 (aged 25)	73	(Germany) 1. FC Köln
11	FW	Miroslav Klose	9 June 1978 (aged 32)	96	(Germany) Bayern Munich
12	GK	Tim Wiese	17 December 1981 (aged 28)	2	(Germany) Werder Bremen
13	MF	Thomas Müller	13 September 1989 (aged 20)	2	(Germany) Bayern Munich
14	DF	Holger Badstuber	13 March 1989 (aged 21)	2	(Germany) Bayern Munich
15	MF	Piotr Trochowski	22 March 1984 (aged 26)	31	(Germany) Hamburger SV
16	DF	Philipp Lahm (c)	11 November 1983 (aged 26)	65	(Germany) Bayern Munich
17	DF	Per Mertesacker	29 September 1984 (aged 25)	62	(Germany) Werder Bremen
18	MF	Toni Kroos	4 January 1990 (aged 20)	4	(Germany) Bayer Leverkusen
19	FW	Cacau	27 March 1981 (aged 29)	8	(Germany) VfB Stuttgart
20	DF	Jérôme Boateng	3 September 1988 (aged 21)	5	(Germany) Hamburger SV
21	MF	Marko Marin	13 March 1989 (aged 21)	9	(Germany) Werder Bremen
22	GK	Hans-Jörg Butt	28 May 1974 (aged 36)	3	(Germany) Bayern Munich
23	FW	Mario Gómez	10 July 1985 (aged 24)	34	(Germany) Bayern Munich

=== Ghana ===
Coach: (Serbia) Milovan Rajevac

No.	Pos.	Player	Date of birth (age)	Caps	Club
1	GK	Daniel Agyei	10 November 1989 (aged 20)	2	(Ghana) Liberty Professionals
2	DF	Hans Sarpei	28 June 1976 (aged 33)	23	(Germany) Bayer Leverkusen
3	FW	Asamoah Gyan	22 November 1985 (aged 24)	32	(France) Rennes
4	DF	John Paintsil	15 June 1981 (aged 28)	65	(England) Fulham
5	DF	John Mensah (c)	29 November 1982 (aged 27)	58	(England) Sunderland
6	MF	Anthony Annan	21 July 1986 (aged 23)	38	(Norway) Rosenborg
7	DF	Samuel Inkoom	1 June 1989 (aged 21)	15	(Switzerland) Basel
8	DF	Jonathan Mensah	13 July 1990 (aged 19)	3	(Spain) Granada
9	MF	Derek Boateng	2 May 1983 (aged 27)	19	(Spain) Getafe
10	MF	Stephen Appiah	24 December 1980 (aged 29)	56	(Italy) Bologna
11	MF	Sulley Muntari	27 August 1984 (aged 25)	52	(Italy) Inter Milan
12	FW	Prince Tagoe	9 November 1986 (aged 23)	17	(Germany) 1899 Hoffenheim
13	MF	André Ayew	17 December 1989 (aged 20)	15	(France) Arles-Avignon
14	FW	Matthew Amoah	24 October 1980 (aged 29)	31	(Netherlands) NAC
15	DF	Isaac Vorsah	21 June 1988 (aged 21)	6	(Germany) 1899 Hoffenheim
16	GK	Stephen Ahorlu	5 September 1988 (aged 21)	0	(Ghana) Heart of Lions
17	DF	Ibrahim Ayew	16 April 1988 (aged 22)	6	(Egypt) Zamalek
18	FW	Dominic Adiyiah	29 November 1989 (aged 20)	4	(Italy) Milan
19	DF	Lee Addy	26 September 1985 (aged 24)	3	(Ghana) Bechem Chelsea
20	MF	Quincy Owusu-Abeyie	15 April 1986 (aged 24)	12	(Qatar) Al Sadd
21	MF	Kwadwo Asamoah	9 December 1988 (aged 21)	29	(Italy) Udinese
22	GK	Richard Kingson	13 June 1978 (aged 31)	58	(England) Wigan Athletic
23	MF	Kevin-Prince Boateng	6 March 1987 (aged 23)	0	(England) Portsmouth

=== Serbia ===
Coach: Radomir Antić

No.	Pos.	Player	Date of birth (age)	Caps	Club
1	GK	Vladimir Stojković	29 July 1983 (aged 26)	33	(England) Wigan Athletic
2	DF	Antonio Rukavina	26 January 1984 (aged 26)	20	(Germany) 1860 Munich
3	DF	Aleksandar Kolarov	10 November 1985 (aged 24)	13	(Italy) Lazio
4	MF	Gojko Kačar	26 January 1987 (aged 23)	17	(Germany) Hertha BSC
5	DF	Nemanja Vidić	21 October 1981 (aged 28)	45	(England) Manchester United
6	DF	Branislav Ivanović	22 February 1984 (aged 26)	31	(England) Chelsea
7	MF	Zoran Tošić	28 April 1987 (aged 23)	21	(Germany) 1. FC Köln
8	FW	Danko Lazović	17 May 1983 (aged 27)	37	(Russia) Zenit Saint Petersburg
9	FW	Marko Pantelić	15 September 1978 (aged 31)	32	(Netherlands) Ajax
10	MF	Dejan Stanković (c)	11 September 1978 (aged 31)	88	(Italy) Inter Milan
11	MF	Nenad Milijaš	30 April 1983 (aged 27)	17	(England) Wolverhampton Wanderers
12	GK	Bojan Isailović	25 March 1980 (aged 30)	4	(Poland) Zagłębie Lubin
13	DF	Aleksandar Luković	23 October 1982 (aged 27)	21	(Italy) Udinese
14	MF	Milan Jovanović	18 April 1981 (aged 29)	26	(Belgium) Standard Liège
15	FW	Nikola Žigić	25 September 1980 (aged 29)	45	(Spain) Valencia
16	DF	Ivan Obradović	25 July 1988 (aged 21)	12	(Spain) Zaragoza
17	MF	Miloš Krasić	1 November 1984 (aged 25)	31	(Russia) CSKA Moscow
18	MF	Miloš Ninković	25 December 1984 (aged 25)	9	(Ukraine) Dynamo Kyiv
19	MF	Radosav Petrović	8 March 1989 (aged 21)	9	(Serbia) Partizan
20	DF	Neven Subotić	10 December 1988 (aged 21)	13	(Germany) Borussia Dortmund
21	FW	Dragan Mrđa	23 January 1984 (aged 26)	6	(Serbia) Vojvodina
22	MF	Zdravko Kuzmanović	22 September 1987 (aged 22)	27	(Germany) VfB Stuttgart
23	GK	Anđelko Đuričić	21 November 1980 (aged 29)	1	(Portugal) União de Leiria

== Group E ==
=== Cameroon ===
Coach: (France) Paul Le Guen

No.	Pos.	Player	Date of birth (age)	Caps	Club
1	GK	Carlos Kameni	18 February 1984 (aged 26)	58	(Spain) Espanyol
2	DF	Benoît Assou-Ekotto	24 March 1984 (aged 26)	4	(England) Tottenham Hotspur
3	DF	Nicolas Nkoulou	27 March 1990 (aged 20)	6	(France) Monaco
4	DF	Rigobert Song	1 July 1976 (aged 33)	133	(Turkey) Trabzonspor
5	DF	Sébastien Bassong	9 July 1986 (aged 23)	3	(England) Tottenham Hotspur
6	MF	Alex Song	9 September 1987 (aged 22)	20	(England) Arsenal
7	MF	Landry N'Guémo	28 November 1985 (aged 24)	17	(Scotland) Celtic
8	DF	Geremi	20 December 1978 (aged 31)	109	(Turkey) Ankaragücü
9	FW	Samuel Eto'o (c)	10 March 1981 (aged 29)	92	(Italy) Inter Milan
10	MF	Achille Emaná	5 June 1982 (aged 28)	32	(Spain) Real Betis
11	MF	Jean Makoun	29 May 1983 (aged 27)	46	(France) Lyon
12	DF	Gaëtan Bong	25 April 1988 (aged 22)	0	(France) Valenciennes
13	FW	Eric Maxim Choupo-Moting	23 March 1989 (aged 21)	0	(Germany) 1. FC Nürnberg
14	DF	Aurélien Chedjou	20 June 1985 (aged 24)	8	(France) Lille
15	FW	Pierre Webó	20 January 1982 (aged 28)	39	(Spain) Mallorca
16	GK	Souleymanou Hamidou	22 November 1973 (aged 36)	40	(Turkey) Kayserispor
17	FW	Mohammadou Idrissou	8 March 1980 (aged 30)	28	(Germany) SC Freiburg
18	MF	Eyong Enoh	23 March 1986 (aged 24)	12	(Netherlands) Ajax
19	DF	Stéphane Mbia	20 May 1986 (aged 24)	29	(France) Marseille
20	MF	Georges Mandjeck	9 December 1988 (aged 21)	4	(Germany) 1. FC Kaiserslautern
21	MF	Joël Matip	8 August 1991 (aged 18)	1	(Germany) Schalke 04
22	GK	Guy N'dy Assembé	28 February 1986 (aged 24)	0	(France) Valenciennes
23	FW	Vincent Aboubakar	22 January 1992 (aged 18)	0	(Cameroon) Cotonsport Garoua

=== Denmark ===
Coach: Morten Olsen

No.	Pos.	Player	Date of birth (age)	Caps	Club
1	GK	Thomas Sørensen	12 June 1976 (aged 33)	86	(England) Stoke City
2	MF	Christian Poulsen	28 February 1980 (aged 30)	74	(Italy) Juventus
3	DF	Simon Kjær	26 March 1989 (aged 21)	9	(Italy) Palermo
4	DF	Daniel Agger	12 December 1984 (aged 25)	32	(England) Liverpool
5	DF	William Kvist	24 February 1985 (aged 25)	14	(Denmark) Copenhagen
6	DF	Lars Jacobsen	20 September 1979 (aged 30)	31	(England) Blackburn Rovers
7	MF	Daniel Jensen	25 June 1979 (aged 30)	49	(Germany) Werder Bremen
8	MF	Jesper Grønkjær	12 August 1977 (aged 32)	78	(Denmark) Copenhagen
9	FW	Jon Dahl Tomasson (c)	29 August 1976 (aged 33)	110	(Netherlands) Feyenoord
10	MF	Martin Jørgensen	6 October 1975 (aged 34)	96	(Denmark) AGF
11	FW	Nicklas Bendtner	16 January 1988 (aged 22)	32	(England) Arsenal
12	MF	Thomas Kahlenberg	20 March 1983 (aged 27)	31	(Germany) VfL Wolfsburg
13	DF	Per Krøldrup	31 July 1979 (aged 30)	30	(Italy) Fiorentina
14	MF	Jakob Poulsen	7 July 1983 (aged 26)	13	(Denmark) AGF
15	DF	Simon Poulsen	7 October 1984 (aged 25)	5	(Netherlands) AZ
16	GK	Stephan Andersen	26 November 1981 (aged 28)	7	(Denmark) Brøndby
17	FW	Mikkel Beckmann	24 October 1983 (aged 26)	5	(Denmark) Randers
18	FW	Søren Larsen	6 September 1981 (aged 28)	19	(Germany) MSV Duisburg
19	MF	Dennis Rommedahl	22 July 1978 (aged 31)	96	(Netherlands) Ajax
20	MF	Thomas Enevoldsen	27 July 1987 (aged 22)	6	(Netherlands) Groningen
21	MF	Christian Eriksen	14 February 1992 (aged 18)	3	(Netherlands) Ajax
22	GK	Jesper Christiansen	24 April 1978 (aged 32)	11	(Denmark) Copenhagen
23	DF	Patrick Mtiliga	28 January 1981 (aged 29)	4	(Spain) Málaga

=== Japan ===
Coach: Takeshi Okada

No.	Pos.	Player	Date of birth (age)	Caps	Club
1	GK	Seigo Narazaki	15 April 1976 (aged 34)	76	(Japan) Nagoya Grampus
2	MF	Yuki Abe	6 September 1981 (aged 28)	45	(Japan) Urawa Red Diamonds
3	DF	Yūichi Komano	25 July 1981 (aged 28)	53	(Japan) Júbilo Iwata
4	DF	Marcus Tulio Tanaka	24 April 1981 (aged 29)	39	(Japan) Nagoya Grampus
5	DF	Yuto Nagatomo	12 September 1986 (aged 23)	26	(Japan) FC Tokyo
6	DF	Atsuto Uchida	27 March 1988 (aged 22)	31	(Japan) Kashima Antlers
7	MF	Yasuhito Endō	28 January 1980 (aged 30)	94	(Japan) Gamba Osaka
8	FW	Daisuke Matsui	11 May 1981 (aged 29)	23	(France) Grenoble
9	FW	Shinji Okazaki	16 April 1986 (aged 24)	28	(Japan) Shimizu S-Pulse
10	MF	Shunsuke Nakamura	24 June 1978 (aged 31)	97	(Japan) Yokohama F. Marinos
11	FW	Keiji Tamada	11 April 1980 (aged 30)	70	(Japan) Nagoya Grampus
12	FW	Kisho Yano	5 April 1984 (aged 26)	18	(Japan) Albirex Niigata
13	DF	Daiki Iwamasa	30 January 1982 (aged 28)	2	(Japan) Kashima Antlers
14	MF	Kengo Nakamura	31 October 1980 (aged 29)	47	(Japan) Kawasaki Frontale
15	DF	Yasuyuki Konno	25 January 1983 (aged 27)	37	(Japan) FC Tokyo
16	FW	Yoshito Ōkubo	9 June 1982 (aged 28)	49	(Japan) Vissel Kobe
17	MF	Makoto Hasebe	18 January 1984 (aged 26)	31	(Germany) VfL Wolfsburg
18	MF	Keisuke Honda	13 June 1986 (aged 23)	15	(Russia) CSKA Moscow
19	FW	Takayuki Morimoto	7 May 1988 (aged 22)	6	(Italy) Catania
20	MF	Junichi Inamoto	18 September 1979 (aged 30)	80	(Japan) Kawasaki Frontale
21	GK	Eiji Kawashima	20 March 1983 (aged 27)	10	(Japan) Kawasaki Frontale
22	DF	Yuji Nakazawa (c)	25 February 1978 (aged 32)	105	(Japan) Yokohama F. Marinos
23	GK	Yoshikatsu Kawaguchi	15 August 1975 (aged 34)	116	(Japan) Júbilo Iwata

=== Netherlands ===
Coach: Bert van Marwijk

No.	Pos.	Player	Date of birth (age)	Caps	Club
1	GK	Maarten Stekelenburg	22 September 1982 (aged 27)	25	(Netherlands) Ajax
2	DF	Gregory van der Wiel	3 February 1988 (aged 22)	8	(Netherlands) Ajax
3	DF	John Heitinga	15 November 1983 (aged 26)	51	(England) Everton
4	DF	Joris Mathijsen	5 April 1980 (aged 30)	53	(Germany) Hamburger SV
5	DF	Giovanni van Bronckhorst (c)	5 February 1975 (aged 35)	97	(Netherlands) Feyenoord
6	MF	Mark van Bommel	22 April 1977 (aged 33)	54	(Germany) Bayern Munich
7	FW	Dirk Kuyt	22 July 1980 (aged 29)	60	(England) Liverpool
8	MF	Nigel de Jong	30 November 1984 (aged 25)	40	(England) Manchester City
9	FW	Robin van Persie	6 August 1983 (aged 26)	41	(England) Arsenal
10	MF	Wesley Sneijder	9 June 1984 (aged 26)	59	(Italy) Inter Milan
11	FW	Arjen Robben	23 January 1984 (aged 26)	46	(Germany) Bayern Munich
12	DF	Khalid Boulahrouz	28 December 1981 (aged 28)	28	(Germany) VfB Stuttgart
13	DF	André Ooijer	11 July 1974 (aged 35)	53	(Netherlands) PSV Eindhoven
14	MF	Demy de Zeeuw	26 May 1983 (aged 27)	23	(Netherlands) Ajax
15	DF	Edson Braafheid	8 April 1983 (aged 27)	5	(Scotland) Celtic
16	GK	Michel Vorm	20 October 1983 (aged 26)	3	(Netherlands) Utrecht
17	FW	Eljero Elia	13 February 1987 (aged 23)	5	(Germany) Hamburger SV
18	MF	Stijn Schaars	11 January 1984 (aged 26)	11	(Netherlands) AZ
19	FW	Ryan Babel	19 December 1986 (aged 23)	38	(England) Liverpool
20	MF	Ibrahim Afellay	2 April 1986 (aged 24)	20	(Netherlands) PSV Eindhoven
21	FW	Klaas-Jan Huntelaar	12 August 1983 (aged 26)	30	(Italy) Milan
22	GK	Sander Boschker	20 October 1970 (aged 39)	1	(Netherlands) Twente
23	MF	Rafael van der Vaart	11 February 1983 (aged 27)	75	(Spain) Real Madrid

== Group F ==
=== Italy ===
Coach: Marcello Lippi

No.	Pos.	Player	Date of birth (age)	Caps	Club
1	GK	Gianluigi Buffon	28 January 1978 (aged 32)	101	(Italy) Juventus
2	DF	Christian Maggio	11 February 1982 (aged 28)	5	(Italy) Napoli
3	DF	Domenico Criscito	30 December 1986 (aged 23)	7	(Italy) Genoa
4	DF	Giorgio Chiellini	14 August 1984 (aged 25)	29	(Italy) Juventus
5	DF	Fabio Cannavaro (c)	13 September 1973 (aged 36)	133	(Italy) Juventus
6	MF	Daniele De Rossi	24 July 1983 (aged 26)	54	(Italy) Roma
7	MF	Simone Pepe	30 August 1983 (aged 26)	15	(Italy) Udinese
8	MF	Gennaro Gattuso	9 January 1978 (aged 32)	72	(Italy) Milan
9	FW	Vincenzo Iaquinta	21 November 1979 (aged 30)	37	(Italy) Juventus
10	FW	Antonio Di Natale	13 October 1977 (aged 32)	33	(Italy) Udinese
11	FW	Alberto Gilardino	5 July 1982 (aged 27)	41	(Italy) Fiorentina
12	GK	Federico Marchetti	7 February 1983 (aged 27)	5	(Italy) Cagliari
13	DF	Salvatore Bocchetti	30 November 1986 (aged 23)	5	(Italy) Genoa
14	GK	Morgan De Sanctis	26 March 1977 (aged 33)	3	(Italy) Napoli
15	MF	Claudio Marchisio	19 January 1986 (aged 24)	4	(Italy) Juventus
16	MF	Mauro Camoranesi	4 October 1976 (aged 33)	53	(Italy) Juventus
17	MF	Angelo Palombo	25 September 1981 (aged 28)	17	(Italy) Sampdoria
18	FW	Fabio Quagliarella	31 January 1983 (aged 27)	20	(Italy) Napoli
19	DF	Gianluca Zambrotta	19 February 1977 (aged 33)	94	(Italy) Milan
20	FW	Giampaolo Pazzini	2 August 1984 (aged 25)	8	(Italy) Sampdoria
21	MF	Andrea Pirlo	19 May 1979 (aged 31)	66	(Italy) Milan
22	MF	Riccardo Montolivo	18 January 1985 (aged 25)	13	(Italy) Fiorentina
23	DF	Leonardo Bonucci	1 May 1987 (aged 23)	2	(Italy) Bari

=== New Zealand ===
Coach: Ricki Herbert

No.	Pos.	Player	Date of birth (age)	Caps	Club
1	GK	Mark Paston	13 December 1976 (aged 33)	23	(Australia) Wellington Phoenix
2	DF	Ben Sigmund	3 February 1981 (aged 29)	14	(Australia) Wellington Phoenix
3	DF	Tony Lochhead	12 January 1982 (aged 28)	30	(Australia) Wellington Phoenix
4	DF	Winston Reid	3 July 1988 (aged 21)	3	(Denmark) Midtjylland
5	DF	Ivan Vicelich	3 September 1976 (aged 33)	66	(New Zealand) Auckland City
6	DF	Ryan Nelsen (c)	18 October 1977 (aged 32)	41	(England) Blackburn Rovers
7	MF	Simon Elliott	10 June 1974 (aged 36)	63	Unattached
8	MF	Tim Brown	6 March 1981 (aged 29)	25	(Australia) Wellington Phoenix
9	FW	Shane Smeltz	29 September 1981 (aged 28)	30	(Australia) Gold Coast United
10	FW	Chris Killen	8 October 1981 (aged 28)	31	(England) Middlesbrough
11	MF	Leo Bertos	20 December 1981 (aged 28)	34	(Australia) Wellington Phoenix
12	GK	Glen Moss	19 January 1983 (aged 27)	15	(Australia) Melbourne Victory
13	MF	Andy Barron	24 December 1980 (aged 29)	11	(New Zealand) Team Wellington
14	FW	Rory Fallon	20 March 1982 (aged 28)	7	(England) Plymouth Argyle
15	MF	Michael McGlinchey	7 January 1987 (aged 23)	5	(Scotland) Motherwell
16	MF	Aaron Clapham	15 January 1987 (aged 23)	0	(New Zealand) Canterbury United
17	MF	Dave Mulligan	24 March 1982 (aged 28)	25	(Australia) Wellington Phoenix
18	DF	Andrew Boyens	18 September 1983 (aged 26)	15	(United States) New York Red Bulls
19	DF	Tommy Smith	31 March 1990 (aged 20)	4	(England) Ipswich Town
20	FW	Chris Wood	7 December 1991 (aged 18)	9	(England) West Bromwich Albion
21	MF	Jeremy Christie	22 May 1983 (aged 27)	22	(United States) FC Tampa Bay
22	MF	Jeremy Brockie	7 October 1987 (aged 22)	18	(Australia) Newcastle Jets
23	GK	James Bannatyne	30 June 1975 (aged 34)	3	(New Zealand) Team Wellington

=== Paraguay ===
Coach: (Argentina) Gerardo Martino

No.	Pos.	Player	Date of birth (age)	Caps	Club
1	GK	Justo Villar	30 June 1977 (aged 32)	71	(Spain) Valladolid
2	DF	Darío Verón	26 June 1979 (aged 30)	27	(Mexico) UNAM
3	DF	Claudio Morel	2 February 1978 (aged 32)	25	(Argentina) Boca Juniors
4	DF	Denis Caniza (c)	29 August 1974 (aged 35)	95	(Mexico) León
5	DF	Julio César Cáceres	5 October 1979 (aged 30)	59	(Brazil) Atlético Mineiro
6	DF	Carlos Bonet	2 October 1977 (aged 32)	60	(Paraguay) Olimpia
7	FW	Óscar Cardozo	20 May 1983 (aged 27)	29	(Portugal) Benfica
8	MF	Édgar Barreto	15 July 1984 (aged 25)	47	(Italy) Atalanta
9	FW	Roque Santa Cruz	16 August 1981 (aged 28)	66	(England) Manchester City
10	FW	Édgar Benítez	8 November 1987 (aged 22)	12	(Mexico) Pachuca
11	MF	Jonathan Santana	19 October 1981 (aged 28)	21	(Germany) VfL Wolfsburg
12	GK	Diego Barreto	16 July 1981 (aged 28)	2	(Paraguay) Cerro Porteño
13	MF	Enrique Vera	10 March 1979 (aged 31)	25	(Ecuador) LDU Quito
14	DF	Paulo da Silva	1 February 1980 (aged 30)	67	(England) Sunderland
15	MF	Víctor Cáceres	25 March 1985 (aged 25)	25	(Paraguay) Libertad
16	MF	Cristian Riveros	16 October 1982 (aged 27)	45	(Mexico) Cruz Azul
17	DF	Aureliano Torres	16 June 1982 (aged 27)	25	(Argentina) San Lorenzo
18	FW	Nelson Haedo Valdez	28 November 1983 (aged 26)	38	(Germany) Borussia Dortmund
19	FW	Lucas Barrios	13 November 1984 (aged 25)	3	(Germany) Borussia Dortmund
20	MF	Néstor Ortigoza	7 October 1984 (aged 25)	3	(Argentina) Argentinos Juniors
21	DF	Antolín Alcaraz	30 July 1982 (aged 27)	5	(Belgium) Club Brugge
22	GK	Aldo Bobadilla	20 April 1976 (aged 34)	18	(Colombia) Independiente Medellín
23	FW	Rodolfo Gamarra	10 December 1988 (aged 21)	2	(Paraguay) Libertad

=== Slovakia ===
Coach: Vladimír Weiss Sr.

No.	Pos.	Player	Date of birth (age)	Caps	Club
1	GK	Ján Mucha	5 December 1982 (aged 27)	15	(Poland) Legia Warsaw
2	DF	Peter Pekarík	30 October 1986 (aged 23)	21	(Germany) VfL Wolfsburg
3	DF	Martin Škrtel	15 December 1984 (aged 25)	39	(England) Liverpool
4	DF	Marek Čech	26 January 1983 (aged 27)	40	(England) West Bromwich Albion
5	DF	Radoslav Zabavník	16 September 1980 (aged 29)	44	(Germany) Mainz 05
6	MF	Zdeno Štrba	9 June 1976 (aged 34)	21	(Greece) Skoda Xanthi
7	MF	Vladimír Weiss Jr.	30 November 1989 (aged 20)	9	(England) Bolton Wanderers
8	MF	Ján Kozák	22 April 1980 (aged 30)	24	(Romania) Timișoara
9	MF	Stanislav Šesták	16 December 1982 (aged 27)	33	(Germany) VfL Bochum
10	MF	Marek Sapara	31 July 1982 (aged 27)	25	(Turkey) Ankaragücü
11	FW	Róbert Vittek	1 April 1982 (aged 28)	70	(Turkey) Ankaragücü
12	GK	Dušan Perniš	28 November 1984 (aged 25)	3	(Scotland) Dundee United
13	FW	Filip Hološko	17 January 1984 (aged 26)	38	(Turkey) Beşiktaş
14	FW	Martin Jakubko	26 February 1980 (aged 30)	24	(Russia) Saturn Moscow Oblast
15	MF	Miroslav Stoch	19 October 1989 (aged 20)	12	(Netherlands) Twente
16	DF	Ján Ďurica	10 December 1981 (aged 28)	39	(Germany) Hannover 96
17	MF	Marek Hamšík (c)	27 July 1987 (aged 22)	32	(Italy) Napoli
18	FW	Erik Jendrišek	26 October 1986 (aged 23)	15	(Germany) 1. FC Kaiserslautern
19	MF	Juraj Kucka	26 February 1987 (aged 23)	6	(Czech Republic) Sparta Prague
20	MF	Kamil Kopúnek	18 May 1984 (aged 26)	9	(Slovakia) Spartak Trnava
21	DF	Kornel Saláta	4 January 1985 (aged 25)	4	(Slovakia) Slovan Bratislava
22	DF	Martin Petráš	2 November 1979 (aged 30)	38	(Italy) Cesena
23	GK	Dušan Kuciak	21 May 1985 (aged 25)	3	(Romania) Vaslui

== Group G ==
=== Brazil ===
Coach: Carlos Dunga

No.	Pos.	Player	Date of birth (age)	Caps	Club
1	GK	Júlio César	3 September 1979 (aged 30)	48	(Italy) Inter Milan
2	DF	Maicon	26 July 1981 (aged 28)	58	(Italy) Inter Milan
3	DF	Lúcio (c)	8 May 1978 (aged 32)	91	(Italy) Inter Milan
4	DF	Juan	1 February 1979 (aged 31)	74	(Italy) Roma
5	MF	Felipe Melo	26 August 1983 (aged 26)	18	(Italy) Juventus
6	DF	Michel Bastos	2 August 1983 (aged 26)	5	(France) Lyon
7	MF	Elano	14 June 1981 (aged 28)	43	(Turkey) Galatasaray
8	MF	Gilberto Silva	7 October 1976 (aged 33)	88	(Greece) Panathinaikos
9	FW	Luís Fabiano	8 November 1980 (aged 29)	38	(Spain) Sevilla
10	MF	Kaká	22 April 1982 (aged 28)	78	(Spain) Real Madrid
11	FW	Robinho	25 January 1984 (aged 26)	75	(Brazil) Santos
12	GK	Heurelho Gomes	15 February 1981 (aged 29)	11	(England) Tottenham Hotspur
13	DF	Dani Alves	6 May 1983 (aged 27)	35	(Spain) Barcelona
14	DF	Luisão	13 February 1981 (aged 29)	42	(Portugal) Benfica
15	DF	Thiago Silva	22 September 1984 (aged 25)	7	(Italy) Milan
16	DF	Gilberto	25 April 1976 (aged 34)	33	(Brazil) Cruzeiro
17	MF	Josué	19 July 1979 (aged 30)	27	(Germany) VfL Wolfsburg
18	MF	Ramires	24 March 1987 (aged 23)	12	(Portugal) Benfica
19	MF	Júlio Baptista	1 October 1981 (aged 28)	46	(Italy) Roma
20	MF	Kléberson	19 June 1979 (aged 30)	31	(Brazil) Flamengo
21	FW	Nilmar	14 July 1984 (aged 25)	17	(Spain) Villarreal
22	GK	Doni	22 October 1979 (aged 30)	10	(Italy) Roma
23	FW	Grafite	2 April 1979 (aged 31)	3	(Germany) VfL Wolfsburg

=== Ivory Coast ===
Coach: (Sweden) Sven-Göran Eriksson

No.	Pos.	Player	Date of birth (age)	Caps	Club
1	GK	Boubacar Barry	30 December 1979 (aged 30)	45	(Belgium) Lokeren
2	DF	Benjamin Angoua	28 November 1986 (aged 23)	7	(France) Valenciennes
3	DF	Arthur Boka	2 April 1983 (aged 27)	54	(Germany) VfB Stuttgart
4	DF	Kolo Touré	19 March 1981 (aged 29)	76	(England) Manchester City
5	MF	Didier Zokora	14 December 1980 (aged 29)	80	(Spain) Sevilla
6	DF	Steve Gohouri	8 February 1981 (aged 29)	11	(England) Wigan Athletic
7	FW	Seydou Doumbia	31 December 1987 (aged 22)	5	(Switzerland) Young Boys
8	FW	Salomon Kalou	5 August 1985 (aged 24)	28	(England) Chelsea
9	MF	Cheick Tioté	21 June 1986 (aged 23)	8	(Netherlands) Twente
10	FW	Gervinho	27 May 1987 (aged 23)	15	(France) Lille
11	FW	Didier Drogba (c)	11 March 1978 (aged 32)	68	(England) Chelsea
12	MF	Jean-Jacques Gosso	15 March 1983 (aged 27)	6	(France) Monaco
13	MF	Romaric	4 June 1983 (aged 27)	38	(Spain) Sevilla
14	MF	Emmanuel Koné	31 December 1986 (aged 23)	12	(Romania) Internațional
15	FW	Aruna Dindane	26 November 1980 (aged 29)	54	(England) Portsmouth
16	GK	Aristide Zogbo	30 December 1981 (aged 28)	6	(Israel) Maccabi Netanya
17	DF	Siaka Tiéné	22 March 1982 (aged 28)	55	(France) Valenciennes
18	MF	Kader Keïta	6 August 1981 (aged 28)	55	(Turkey) Galatasaray
19	MF	Yaya Touré	13 May 1983 (aged 27)	47	(Spain) Barcelona
20	DF	Guy Demel	13 June 1981 (aged 28)	26	(Germany) Hamburger SV
21	DF	Emmanuel Eboué	4 June 1983 (aged 27)	52	(England) Arsenal
22	DF	Sol Bamba	13 January 1985 (aged 25)	16	(Scotland) Hibernian
23	GK	Daniel Yeboah	13 November 1984 (aged 25)	4	(Ivory Coast) ASEC Mimosas

=== North Korea ===
Coach: Kim Jong-hun

No.	Pos.	Player	Date of birth (age)	Caps	Club
1	GK	Ri Myong-guk	9 September 1986 (aged 23)	28	(North Korea) Pyongyang City
2	DF	Cha Jong-hyok	25 September 1985 (aged 24)	31	(North Korea) Amrokgang
3	DF	Ri Jun-il	24 August 1987 (aged 22)	26	(North Korea) Sobaeksu
4	MF	Pak Nam-chol I	2 July 1985 (aged 24)	35	(North Korea) April 25
5	DF	Ri Kwang-chon	4 September 1985 (aged 24)	41	(North Korea) April 25
6	FW	Kim Kum-il	10 October 1987 (aged 22)	11	(North Korea) April 25
7	FW	An Chol-hyok	27 June 1987 (aged 22)	16	(North Korea) Rimyongsu
8	DF	Ji Yun-nam	20 November 1976 (aged 33)	23	(North Korea) April 25
9	FW	Jong Tae-se	2 March 1984 (aged 26)	20	(Japan) Kawasaki Frontale
10	FW	Hong Yong-jo (c)	22 May 1982 (aged 28)	40	(Russia) Rostov
11	MF	Mun In-guk	29 September 1978 (aged 31)	42	(North Korea) April 25
12	FW	Choe Kum-chol	9 February 1987 (aged 23)	16	(North Korea) April 25
13	DF	Pak Chol-jin	5 September 1985 (aged 24)	34	(North Korea) Amrokgang
14	DF	Pak Nam-chol II	3 October 1988 (aged 21)	12	(North Korea) Amrokgang
15	MF	Kim Yong-jun	19 July 1983 (aged 26)	52	(North Korea) Pyongyang City
16	DF	Nam Song-chol	7 May 1982 (aged 28)	41	(North Korea) April 25
17	MF	An Yong-hak	25 October 1978 (aged 31)	24	(Japan) Omiya Ardija
18	GK	Kim Myong-gil	16 October 1984 (aged 25)	10	(North Korea) Amrokgang
19	MF	Ri Chol-myong	18 February 1988 (aged 22)	10	(North Korea) Pyongyang City
20	GK	Kim Myong-won	15 July 1983 (aged 26)	9	(North Korea) Amrokgang
21	DF	Ri Kwang-hyok	17 August 1987 (aged 22)	15	(North Korea) Kyonggongop
22	MF	Kim Kyong-il	11 December 1988 (aged 21)	7	(North Korea) Rimyongsu
23	DF	Pak Sung-hyok	30 May 1990 (aged 20)	3	(North Korea) Sobaeksu

=== Portugal ===
Coach: Carlos Queiroz

No.	Pos.	Player	Date of birth (age)	Caps	Club
1	GK	Eduardo	19 September 1982 (aged 27)	15	(Portugal) Braga
2	DF	Bruno Alves	27 November 1981 (aged 28)	31	(Portugal) Porto
3	DF	Paulo Ferreira	18 January 1979 (aged 31)	61	(England) Chelsea
4	DF	Rolando	31 August 1985 (aged 24)	8	(Portugal) Porto
5	MF	Duda	27 June 1980 (aged 29)	16	(Spain) Málaga
6	DF	Ricardo Carvalho	18 May 1978 (aged 32)	63	(England) Chelsea
7	FW	Cristiano Ronaldo (c)	5 February 1985 (aged 25)	72	(Spain) Real Madrid
8	MF	Pedro Mendes	26 February 1979 (aged 31)	8	(Portugal) Sporting CP
9	FW	Liédson	17 December 1977 (aged 32)	10	(Portugal) Sporting CP
10	MF	Danny	7 August 1983 (aged 26)	11	(Russia) Zenit Saint Petersburg
11	MF	Simão	31 October 1979 (aged 30)	81	(Spain) Atlético Madrid
12	GK	Beto	1 May 1982 (aged 28)	1	(Portugal) Porto
13	DF	Miguel	4 January 1980 (aged 30)	57	(Spain) Valencia
14	MF	Miguel Veloso	11 May 1986 (aged 24)	12	(Portugal) Sporting CP
15	DF	Pepe	26 February 1983 (aged 27)	25	(Spain) Real Madrid
16	MF	Raul Meireles	17 March 1983 (aged 27)	34	(Portugal) Porto
17	MF	Ruben Amorim	27 January 1985 (aged 25)	0	(Portugal) Benfica
18	FW	Hugo Almeida	23 May 1984 (aged 26)	26	(Germany) Werder Bremen
19	MF	Tiago	2 May 1981 (aged 29)	51	(Spain) Atlético Madrid
20	MF	Deco	27 August 1977 (aged 32)	74	(England) Chelsea
21	DF	Ricardo Costa	16 May 1981 (aged 29)	8	(France) Lille
22	GK	Daniel Fernandes	25 September 1983 (aged 26)	2	(Greece) Iraklis
23	DF	Fábio Coentrão	11 March 1988 (aged 22)	4	(Portugal) Benfica

== Group H ==
=== Chile ===
Coach: (Argentina) Marcelo Bielsa

No.	Pos.	Player	Date of birth (age)	Caps	Club
1	GK	Claudio Bravo (c)	13 April 1983 (aged 27)	41	(Spain) Real Sociedad
2	DF	Ismael Fuentes	4 August 1981 (aged 28)	25	(Chile) Universidad Católica
3	DF	Waldo Ponce	4 December 1982 (aged 27)	23	(Chile) Universidad Católica
4	MF	Mauricio Isla	12 June 1988 (aged 21)	10	(Italy) Udinese
5	DF	Pablo Contreras	11 September 1978 (aged 31)	49	(Greece) PAOK
6	MF	Carlos Carmona	21 February 1987 (aged 23)	18	(Italy) Reggina
7	FW	Alexis Sánchez	19 December 1988 (aged 21)	26	(Italy) Udinese
8	MF	Arturo Vidal	22 May 1987 (aged 23)	21	(Germany) Bayer Leverkusen
9	FW	Humberto Suazo	10 May 1981 (aged 29)	41	(Spain) Zaragoza
10	MF	Jorge Valdivia	19 October 1983 (aged 26)	36	(United Arab Emirates) Al Ain
11	FW	Mark González	10 July 1984 (aged 25)	38	(Russia) CSKA Moscow
12	GK	Miguel Pinto	4 July 1983 (aged 26)	13	Universidad de Chile
13	MF	Marco Estrada	28 May 1983 (aged 27)	20	Universidad de Chile
14	MF	Matías Fernández	15 May 1986 (aged 24)	35	(Portugal) Sporting CP
15	DF	Jean Beausejour	1 June 1984 (aged 26)	23	(Mexico) América
16	FW	Fabián Orellana	27 January 1986 (aged 24)	13	(Spain) Xerez
17	DF	Gary Medel	3 August 1987 (aged 22)	23	(Argentina) Boca Juniors
18	DF	Gonzalo Jara	29 August 1985 (aged 24)	31	(England) West Bromwich Albion
19	DF	Gonzalo Fierro	21 March 1983 (aged 27)	16	(Brazil) Flamengo
20	MF	Rodrigo Millar	3 November 1981 (aged 28)	19	(Chile) Colo-Colo
21	MF	Rodrigo Tello	14 October 1979 (aged 30)	32	(Turkey) Beşiktaş
22	FW	Esteban Paredes	1 August 1980 (aged 29)	12	(Chile) Colo-Colo
23	GK	Luis Marín	18 May 1983 (aged 27)	2	(Chile) Unión Española

=== Honduras ===
Coach: (Colombia) Reinaldo Rueda

No.	Pos.	Player	Date of birth (age)	Caps	Club
1	GK	Ricardo Canales	30 May 1982 (aged 28)	2	(Honduras) Motagua
2	DF	Osman Chávez	29 July 1984 (aged 25)	26	(Honduras) Platense
3	DF	Maynor Figueroa	2 May 1983 (aged 27)	66	(England) Wigan Athletic
4	DF	Johnny Palacios	20 December 1986 (aged 23)	4	(Honduras) Olimpia
5	DF	Víctor Bernárdez	24 May 1982 (aged 28)	40	(Belgium) Anderlecht
6	MF	Hendry Thomas	23 February 1985 (aged 25)	39	(England) Wigan Athletic
7	MF	Ramón Núñez	14 November 1984 (aged 25)	16	(Honduras) Olimpia
8	MF	Wilson Palacios	29 July 1984 (aged 25)	69	(England) Tottenham Hotspur
9	FW	Carlos Pavón	19 October 1973 (aged 36)	98	(Honduras) Real España
10	FW	Jerry Palacios	1 November 1982 (aged 27)	11	(China) Hangzhou Greentown
11	FW	David Suazo	5 November 1979 (aged 30)	50	(Italy) Genoa
12	FW	Georgie Welcome	9 March 1985 (aged 25)	11	(Honduras) Motagua
13	FW	Roger Espinoza	25 October 1986 (aged 23)	10	(United States) Kansas City Wizards
14	DF	Boniek García	4 September 1984 (aged 25)	42	(Honduras) Olimpia
15	FW	Walter Martínez	29 March 1982 (aged 28)	34	(Honduras) Marathón
16	DF	Mauricio Sabillón	11 November 1978 (aged 31)	25	(China) Hangzhou Greentown
17	MF	Édgar Álvarez	9 January 1980 (aged 30)	46	(Italy) Bari
18	GK	Noel Valladares	3 May 1977 (aged 33)	71	(Honduras) Olimpia
19	MF	Danilo Turcios	8 May 1978 (aged 32)	82	(Honduras) Olimpia
20	MF	Amado Guevara (c)	2 May 1976 (aged 34)	133	(Honduras) Motagua
21	DF	Emilio Izaguirre	10 May 1986 (aged 24)	39	(Honduras) Motagua
22	GK	Donis Escober	3 February 1981 (aged 29)	11	(Honduras) Olimpia
23	DF	Sergio Mendoza	23 May 1981 (aged 29)	46	(Honduras) Motagua

=== Spain ===
Coach: Vicente del Bosque

No.	Pos.	Player	Date of birth (age)	Caps	Club
1	GK	Iker Casillas (c)	20 May 1981 (aged 29)	104	(Spain) Real Madrid
2	DF	Raúl Albiol	4 September 1985 (aged 24)	23	(Spain) Real Madrid
3	DF	Gerard Piqué	2 February 1987 (aged 23)	16	(Spain) Barcelona
4	DF	Carlos Marchena	31 July 1979 (aged 30)	59	(Spain) Valencia
5	DF	Carles Puyol	13 April 1978 (aged 32)	83	(Spain) Barcelona
6	MF	Andrés Iniesta	11 May 1984 (aged 26)	43	(Spain) Barcelona
7	FW	David Villa	3 December 1981 (aged 28)	58	(Spain) Valencia
8	MF	Xavi	25 January 1980 (aged 30)	87	(Spain) Barcelona
9	FW	Fernando Torres	20 March 1984 (aged 26)	73	(England) Liverpool
10	MF	Cesc Fàbregas	4 May 1987 (aged 23)	49	(England) Arsenal
11	DF	Joan Capdevila	3 February 1978 (aged 32)	46	(Spain) Villarreal
12	GK	Víctor Valdés	14 January 1982 (aged 28)	1	(Spain) Barcelona
13	MF	Juan Mata	28 April 1988 (aged 22)	8	(Spain) Valencia
14	MF	Xabi Alonso	25 November 1981 (aged 28)	69	(Spain) Real Madrid
15	DF	Sergio Ramos	30 March 1986 (aged 24)	60	(Spain) Real Madrid
16	MF	Sergio Busquets	16 July 1988 (aged 21)	13	(Spain) Barcelona
17	DF	Álvaro Arbeloa	17 January 1983 (aged 27)	15	(Spain) Real Madrid
18	FW	Pedro	28 July 1987 (aged 22)	3	(Spain) Barcelona
19	FW	Fernando Llorente	26 February 1985 (aged 25)	7	(Spain) Athletic Bilbao
20	MF	Javi Martínez	2 September 1988 (aged 21)	2	(Spain) Athletic Bilbao
21	MF	David Silva	8 January 1986 (aged 24)	36	(Spain) Valencia
22	MF	Jesús Navas	21 November 1985 (aged 24)	6	(Spain) Sevilla
23	GK	Pepe Reina	31 August 1982 (aged 27)	20	(England) Liverpool

=== Switzerland ===
Coach: (Germany) Ottmar Hitzfeld

No.	Pos.	Player	Date of birth (age)	Caps	Club
1	GK	Diego Benaglio	8 September 1983 (aged 26)	27	(Germany) VfL Wolfsburg
2	DF	Stephan Lichtsteiner	16 January 1984 (aged 26)	28	(Italy) Lazio
3	DF	Ludovic Magnin	20 April 1979 (aged 31)	62	(Switzerland) Zürich
4	DF	Philippe Senderos	14 February 1985 (aged 25)	40	(England) Everton
5	DF	Steve von Bergen	10 June 1983 (aged 27)	11	(Germany) Hertha BSC
6	MF	Benjamin Huggel	7 July 1977 (aged 32)	38	(Switzerland) Basel
7	MF	Tranquillo Barnetta	22 May 1985 (aged 25)	52	(Germany) Bayer Leverkusen
8	MF	Gökhan Inler	27 June 1984 (aged 25)	36	(Italy) Udinese
9	FW	Alexander Frei (c)	15 July 1979 (aged 30)	75	(Switzerland) Basel
10	FW	Blaise Nkufo	25 May 1975 (aged 35)	31	(Netherlands) Twente
11	MF	Valon Behrami	19 April 1985 (aged 25)	27	(England) West Ham United
12	GK	Marco Wölfli	22 August 1982 (aged 27)	5	(Switzerland) Young Boys
13	DF	Stéphane Grichting	30 March 1979 (aged 31)	35	(France) Auxerre
14	MF	Marco Padalino	8 December 1983 (aged 26)	8	(Italy) Sampdoria
15	MF	Hakan Yakin	22 February 1977 (aged 33)	81	(Switzerland) Luzern
16	MF	Gélson Fernandes	2 September 1986 (aged 23)	24	(France) Saint-Étienne
17	DF	Reto Ziegler	16 January 1986 (aged 24)	12	(Italy) Sampdoria
18	FW	Albert Bunjaku	29 November 1983 (aged 26)	3	(Germany) 1. FC Nürnberg
19	FW	Eren Derdiyok	12 June 1988 (aged 21)	21	(Germany) Bayer Leverkusen
20	MF	Pirmin Schwegler	9 March 1987 (aged 23)	4	(Germany) Eintracht Frankfurt
21	GK	Johnny Leoni	30 June 1984 (aged 25)	0	(Switzerland) Zürich
22	DF	Mario Eggimann	24 January 1981 (aged 29)	8	(Germany) Hannover 96
23	MF	Xherdan Shaqiri	10 October 1991 (aged 18)	3	(Switzerland) Basel

== Player statistics ==
=== Player representation by age ===
==== Players ====
- Oldest: (England) David James (39 years, 314 days)
- Youngest: (Denmark) Christian Eriksen (18 years, 117 days)

==== Goalkeepers ====
- Oldest: (England) David James (39 years, 314 days)
- Youngest: (Ghana) Daniel Agyei (20 years, 213 days)

==== Captains ====
- Oldest: (Italy) Fabio Cannavaro (36 years, 271 days)
- Youngest: (Slovakia) Marek Hamšík (22 years, 319 days)

=== Player representation by club ===
Players	England	Spain	Italy	Germany	France	Netherlands	Other UEFA	Other regions
13		Barcelona						
12	Chelsea; Liverpool							
11				Bayern Munich				
10	Arsenal; Tottenham Hotspur	Real Madrid	Inter Milan				(Greece) Panathinaikos	
9				VfL Wolfsburg		Ajax		
8	Portsmouth		Juventus; Udinese					
7	Everton; Manchester City	Valencia	Milan	Hamburger SV; VfB Stuttgart			(Portugal) Benfica	(North Korea) April 25
6				Bayer Leverkusen; Werder Bremen	Lyon	Twente	(Portugal) Porto	(Honduras) Olimpia
5	Fulham; West Ham United; Wigan Athletic; Manchester United	Sevilla	Napoli; Roma		Monaco; Marseille; Valenciennes	AZ	(Turkey) Galatasaray (Switzerland) Basel	(Mexico) Guadalajara (Honduras) Motagua (Australia) Wellington Phoenix (North Korea) Amrokgang

=== Player representation by league ===
Country	Players	Percent	Outside national squad
England	117	16%	92
Germany	84	11%	61
Italy	80	11%	57
Spain	59	8%	39
France	45	6%	34
Netherlands	34	5%	25
Japan	25	3%	6
Greece	21	3%	7
Mexico	21	3%	7
Portugal	21	3%	10
North Korea	20	3%	0
Others	209	28%	
Total	736		

The English, German, and Italian squads were made up entirely of players from the respective countries' domestic leagues. The Nigerian squad was made up entirely of players employed by overseas clubs. Although Russia, Turkey, and Scotland failed to qualify for the finals, their domestic leagues were represented by 14, 14, and 10 players respectively. Altogether, there were 52 national leagues that had players in the tournament.

=== Average age of squads ===
Average age	Countries
24	Germany, Ghana, North Korea
25	Cameroon, Chile, Nigeria, Serbia, Spain
26	Algeria, Ivory Coast, Slovakia, Slovenia, South Africa, Switzerland, United States, Uruguay
27	Argentina, Denmark, France, Greece, Japan, Mexico, Netherlands, New Zealand, Portugal, South Korea
28	Australia, Brazil, England, Honduras, Italy, Paraguay

=== Coaches representation by country ===
Nº	Country	Coaches
3	Argentina	Marcelo Bielsa (Chile), Diego Maradona, Gerardo Martino (Paraguay)
3	Germany	Ottmar Hitzfeld (Switzerland), Joachim Löw, Otto Rehhagel (Greece)
2	Brazil	Dunga, Carlos Alberto Parreira (South Africa)
2	France	Raymond Domenech, Paul Le Guen (Cameroon)
2	Italy	Fabio Capello (England), Marcello Lippi
2	Netherlands	Bert van Marwijk, Pim Verbeek (Australia)
2	Serbia	Radomir Antić, Milovan Rajevac (Ghana)
2	Sweden	Sven-Göran Eriksson (Ivory Coast), Lars Lagerbäck (Nigeria)
1	Algeria	Rabah Saâdane
1	Colombia	Reinaldo Rueda (Honduras)
1	Denmark	Morten Olsen
1	Japan	Takeshi Okada
1	Mexico	Javier Aguirre
1	New Zealand	Ricki Herbert
1	North Korea	Kim Jong-hun
1	Portugal	Carlos Queiroz
1	Slovakia	Vladimír Weiss
1	Slovenia	Matjaž Kek
1	South Korea	Huh Jung-moo
1	Spain	Vicente del Bosque
1	United States	Bob Bradley
1	Uruguay	Óscar Tabárez
