= Ji Yun-nam =

North Korean footballer (born 1976)

Ji Yun-Nam
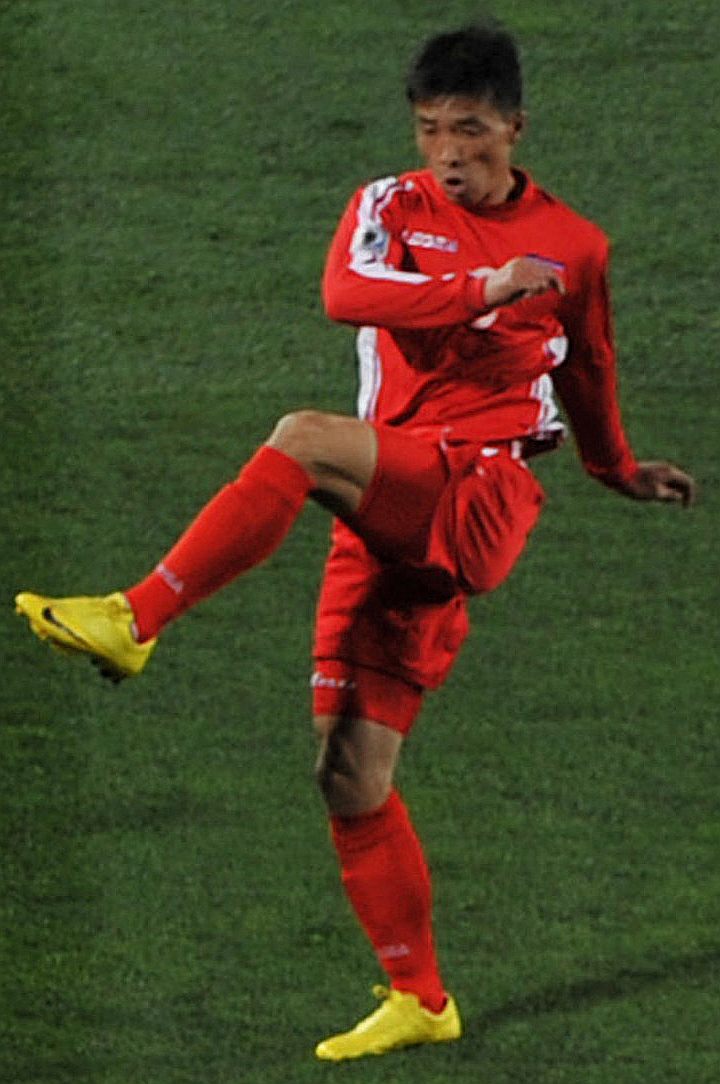
- Ji with North Korea at the 2010 FIFA World Cup

Personal information
- Full name: Ji Yun-nam
- Date of birth: 20 November 1976 (age 49)
- Place of birth: Ichon County, Kangwon Province, North Korea
- Height: 1.74 m (5 ft 8 1/2 in)

Senior career*
Years	Team	Apps	(Gls)
2004–2016	April 25	231	(18)

International career
2004–2011	North Korea	32	(3)
- * Club domestic league appearances and goals

- Ji Yun-nam
- Hangul: 지윤남
- Hanja: 池尹南
- RR: Ji Yunnam
- MR: Chi Yunnam

Ji Yun-Nam (Korean: 지윤남; born 20 November 1976) is a North Korean former professional footballer who played for April 25 in the DPR Korea League.

== International career ==
Ji has appeared for the Korea DPR national football team in eight FIFA World Cup qualifying matches. Primarily a central defensive midfield, Ji plays in the left-back position for the national team.

On 15 June 2010, he scored a goal against Brazil, slotting it past the goalkeeper in the 2010 FIFA World Cup group stage encounter between the highest ranked and the lowest ranked qualified teams at the finals. Brazil ended up winning the game 2–1. His would be the only goal scored by North Korea in the tournament.

Following the Brazil-Korea DPR game, players exchanged shirts, revealing Ji's lean and muscular physique. This generated the affectionate nickname "The Peoples' Six-pack".

=== Goals ===
#	Date	Venue	Opponent	Score	Result	Competition
1.	23 February 2008	Chongqing Olympic Sports Center, Chongqing, China	China	1–0	1–3	2008 East Asian Football Championship
2.	27 August 2009	World Games Stadium, Kaohsiung, Taiwan	Chinese Taipei	2–1	2–1	2010 East Asian Football Championship
3.	15 June 2010	Ellis Park Stadium, Johannesburg, South Africa	Brazil	1–2	1–2	2010 FIFA World Cup
