= Ri Kwang-chon =

North Korean footballer (born 1985)

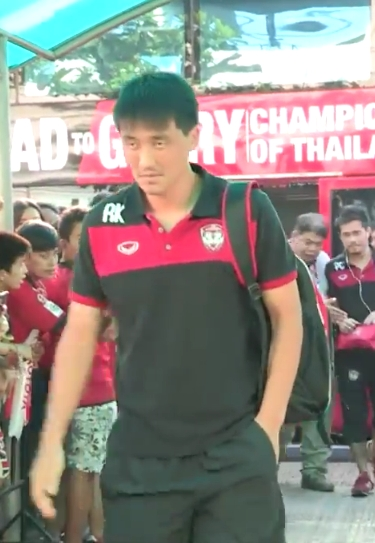
- Ri in 2013

Personal information
- Date of birth: September 4, 1985 (age 41)
- Place of birth: Nampo, North Korea
- Height: 1.83 m (6 ft 0 in)
- Position: Centre-back

Senior career*
Years	Team	Apps	(Gls)
2005–2011	April 25		
2012–2014	Muangthong United	49	(5)
2014	April 25		
2015	Pattaya United	14	(2)

International career^{‡}
2001–2012	North Korea	69	(1)
- * Club domestic league appearances and goals as of August 11, 2012 ‡ National team caps and goals as of March 19, 2012

- Ri Kwang-chon
- Hangul: 리광천
- Hanja: 李光川
- RR: Ri Gwangcheon
- MR: Ri Kwangch'ŏn

Ri Kwang-chon (Korean: 리광천; born 4 September 1985) is a North Korean former footballer who played as a centre-back.

== Club career ==
From 2005 to 2011, Ri played for April 25 and helped them win the league three times in 2002, 2010 and 2011. In 2012, he had a chance to join Chinese side Tianjin Teda but had problems obtaining a work permit and eventually joined Muangthong United in Thailand. After his release from Muangthong, Ri returned to April 25 in 2014, but came back to Thailand a year later to join Pattaya United, retiring that same year. As with many other North Korean footballers, his whereabouts were largely unknown following his retirement. However, in March 2025, the state-run media website Ministry of Physical Culture and Sports of the DPRK revealed that Ri was actively working as the head coach of Ryomyong SC men's team, the current champions of the DPRK Premier League at the time, in the previous 2023/2024 season.

== International career ==
Ri played for the North Korean national team between 2001 and 2012. He represented the country at the 2010 FIFA World Cup and the 2011 AFC Asian Cup.
