= Kim Jong-hun (footballer) =

North Korean footballer (born 1956)

Personal information
- Date of birth: September 1, 1956 (age 70)
- Place of birth: Pyongyang, North Korea
- Position: Defender

Senior career*
Years	Team	Apps	(Gls)
- April 25 Sports Club

International career
1973–1985	North Korea	4	(0)

Managerial career
- –2007: April 25
- 2007–2010: North Korea
- * Club domestic league appearances and goals

- Kim Jong-hun
- Hangul: 김정훈
- Hanja: 金正勳
- RR: Gim Jeonghun
- MR: Kim Chŏnghun

Kim Jong-hun (Korean: 김정훈; born September 1, 1956) is a retired North Korean footballer and football manager. He served as head coach of the North Korea national team, and managed them at the 2010 FIFA World Cup in South Africa.

== Biography ==
As a player, Kim Jong-hun has spent his career at April 25 Sports Club. He was capped four times for North Korea during the qualifications for the 1974 and 1986 FIFA World Cups.

After ending his player career, Kim became a manager. He managed April 25 Sports Team until 2007, when he became the manager of North Korea national team. In 2009, he led the team as it qualified for the 2010 FIFA World Cup, their first since 1966.

After a disappointing showing at the World Cup, Kim faced harsh criticism upon his return to North Korea. Radio Free Asia reported that he was publicly shamed and condemned for hours in front of 400 people, including the North Korean sports minister.

At the same event, the team members were commanded to individually criticize their coach, who was accused of betraying General Kim Jong Un, the country's heir apparent. The report also mentioned that he had been stripped of his membership in the Workers' Party of Korea and forced to work hard labor on a construction site as punishment. It is however unknown whether Kim was really faced with such a violating punishment, as far as North Korea has its information mostly closed from the other world. Little is known about Kim Jong-hun's current (by October 2026) occupation, probably due to the same reason.
