= Ri Jun-il =

North Korean footballer

Ri Jun-Il
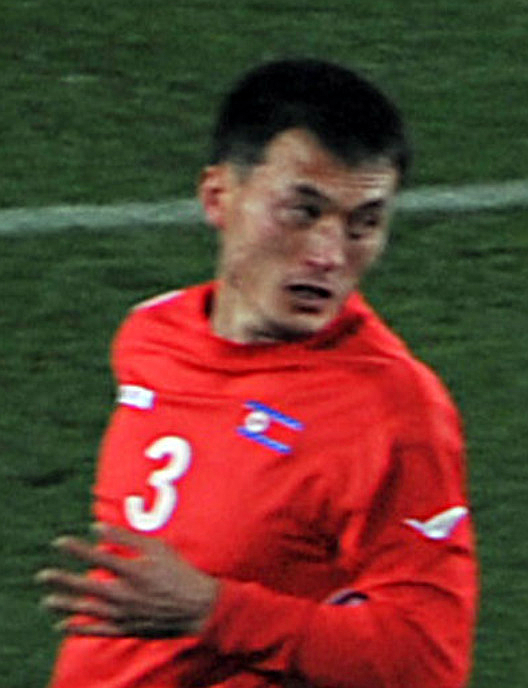
- Jun-il with North Korea in 2010

Personal information
- Full name: Ri Jun-Il
- Date of birth: 24 August 1987 (age 39)
- Place of birth: Pyongyang, North Korea
- Height: 1.78 m (5 ft 10 in)
- Positions: Centre-back; right-back

Team information
- Current team: Sobaeksu
- Number: 6

Senior career*
Years	Team	Apps	(Gls)
2008–	Sobaeksu		

International career
2008–2011	Korea DPR	36	(0)
- * Club domestic league appearances and goals as of December 7, 2009

Ri Jun-Il (Hanja: 李俊一, Korean: 리준일; born 24 August 1987) is a North Korean professional footballer who currently plays as a defender for Sobaeksu in DPR Korea League.

== Club career ==
Since 2008, Ri Jun-Il plays for Sobaeksu in the DPR Korea League.

== International career ==
Ri has been a part of the National team since 2008, and has won 36 caps, scoring no goal. He is also part of the Korean defence that qualified for the 2010 FIFA World Cup in South Africa. He played an integral part of the North Korea team that qualified for the 2010 FIFA World Cup in South Africa.
