= Cha Jong-hyok =

North Korean footballer

Cha Jong-Hyok
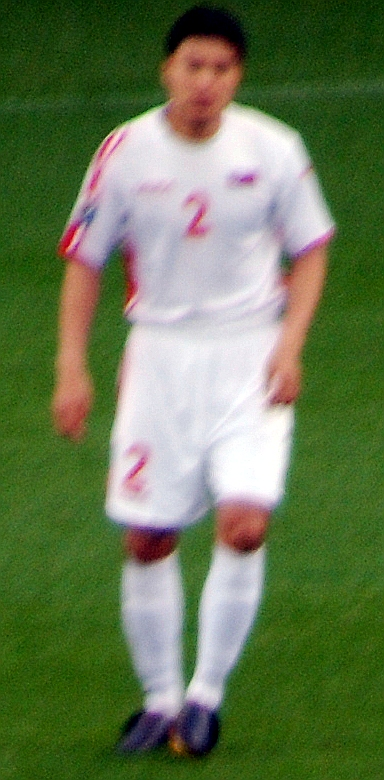
- Cha with North Korea in 2010

Personal information
- Full name: Cha Jong-Hyok
- Date of birth: 25 September 1985 (age 41)
- Place of birth: Pyongyang, North Korea
- Height: 1.78 m (5 ft 10 in)
- Position: Right-back

Senior career*
Years	Team	Apps	(Gls)
2005–2010	Amrokgang		
2010–2015	Wil	121	(2)

International career
2005–2015	North Korea	45	(0)
- * Club domestic league appearances and goals as of 22 May 2015

- Cha Jong-hyok
- Hangul: 차정혁
- Hanja: 車正赫
- RR: Cha Jeonghyeok
- MR: Ch'a Chŏnghyŏk

Cha Jong-Hyok (Korean: 차정혁; born 25 September 1985) is a North Korean former professional football player who played as a Right-back.

== Club career ==
Cha played for Amrokgang in the DPR Korea League from 2005 to 2010. He helped them to the League title in 2007, but the number of games he has played and goals he has scored for them is still unknown. On 27 June 2010, Cha signed a contract with Swiss Challenge League team FC Wil. Cha spent 5 seasons with the Swiss club, making 121 appearances and scoring 2 goals.

== International career ==
Cha has been a part of the National team since 2005, and has won 43 caps for them. He played an integral part of the North Korea team that qualified for the 2010 FIFA World Cup in South Africa and started as right-back in their opening match against Brazil on 15 June.
