= Mun In-guk =

North Korean footballer

Mun In-Guk
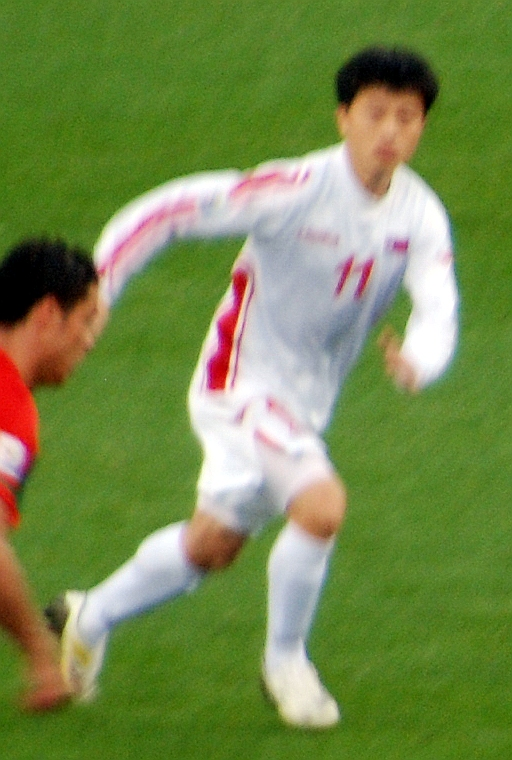
- In-Guk with North Korea in 2010

Personal information
- Full name: Mun In-Guk
- Date of birth: September 29, 1978 (age 48)
- Place of birth: Nampo, North Korea
- Height: 1.67 m (5 ft 6 in)
- Positions: Left midfielder; right midfielder

Senior career*
Years	Team	Apps	(Gls)
2004–2022	April 25	315	(26)

International career
2004–2011	Korea DPR	43	(6)
- * Club domestic league appearances and goals as of September 24, 2008

Mun In-Guk (Korean: 문인국; Hancha: 文人國; born September 29, 1978) is a North Korean former professional footballer.

== Goals for senior national team ==
#	Date	Venue	Opponent	Score	Result	Competition
1	June 24, 2007	Macau Stadium, Macau	Hong Kong	1–0	1–0	East Asian Cup 2008 qualification
2	February 11, 2009	Kim Il-Sung Stadium, Pyongyang, Korea DPR	Saudi Arabia	1–0	1–0	2010 FIFA World Cup Qualification
3	March 28, 2009	Kim Il-Sung Stadium, Pyongyang, Korea DPR	United Arab Emirates	2–0	2–0	2010 FIFA World Cup Qualification
4	August 23, 2009	World Games Stadium, Kaohsiung, Taiwan	Guam	6–2	9–2	2010 East Asian Football Championship
5	November 21, 2009	Nkoloma Stadium, Lusaka, Zambia	Zambia	1–3	1–4	Friendly
6	March 6, 2010	Estadio José Pachencho Romero, Maracaibo, Venezuela	Venezuela	1–1	1–2	Friendly

Awards
Preceded by Kim Jun-Yong	East Asian Football Championship Preliminary; Most Valuable Player; 2009	Succeeded by Jason Cunliffe
