= 2010 in Brazil =

Events in the year 2010 in Brazil.

== Incumbents ==
=== Federal government ===
- President: Luiz Inácio Lula da Silva
- Vice President: José Alencar

=== Governors ===
- Acre: Binho Marques
- Alagoas: Teotônio Vilela Filho
- Amapa:
  - Waldez Góes (until 4 April)
  - Pedro Paulo Dias de Carvalho (4 April-31 December)
- Amazonas:
  - Eduardo Braga (until 31 March)
  - Omar Aziz (starting 31 March)
- Bahia: Jaques Wagner
- Ceará: Cid Gomes
- Espírito Santo: Paulo Hartung
- Goiás: Alcides Rodrigues
- Maranhão: Roseana Sarney
- Mato Grosso:
  - Blairo Maggi (until 31 March)
  - Silval da Cunha (from 31 March)
- Mato Grosso do Sul: André Puccinelli
- Minas Gerais:
  - Aécio Neves (until 31 March)
  - Antônio Anastasia (starting 31 March)
- Pará: Ana Júlia Carepa
- Paraíba: José Maranhão
- Parana:
  - Roberto Requião de Mello e Silva (until 1 April)
  - Orlando Pessuti (from 1 April)
- Pernambuco: Eduardo Campos
- Piauí:
  - Wellington Dias (until 2 April)
  - Wilson Martins (starting 2 April)
- Rio de Janeiro: Sérgio Cabral Filho
- Rio Grande do Norte: Wilma Maria de Faria
- Rio Grande do Sul: Yeda Rorato Crusius
- Rondônia:
  - Ivo Narciso Cassol (until 31 March)
  - João Aparecido Cahulla (starting 31 March)
- Roraima: José de Anchieta Júnior
- Santa Catarina:
  - Luiz Henrique da Silveira (until 25 March)
  - Leonel Pavan (starting 25 March)
- São Paulo:
  - José Serra (until 2 April)
  - Alberto Goldman (starting 2 April)
- Sergipe: Marcelo Déda
- Tocantins: Carlos Henrique Gaguim

=== Vice governors ===
- Acre: Carlos César Correia de Messias
- Alagoas: José Wanderley Neto
- Amapá: Pedro Paulo Dias de Carvalho
- Amazonas: Omar José Abdel Aziz
- Bahia: Edmundo Pereira Santos
- Ceará: Francisco José Pinheiro
- Espírito Santo: Ricardo de Rezende Ferraço
- Goiás: Ademir de Oliveira Meneses
- Maranhão: João Alberto Souza
- Mato Grosso: Silval da Cunha Barbosa
- Mato Grosso do Sul: Murilo Zauith
- Minas Gerais:
  - Antonio Augusto Junho Anastasia (until 31 March)
  - Vacant thereafter
- Pará: Odair Santos Corrêa
- Paraíba: Luciano Cartaxo Pires de Sá
- Paraná: Orlando Pessuti
- Pernambuco: João Soares Lyra Neto
- Piauí:
  - Wilson Martins (until 2 April)
  - Vacant thereafter
- Rio de Janeiro: Luiz Fernando Pezão
- Rio Grande do Norte:
  - Iberê Ferreira (until 31 March)
  - Vacant thereafter
- Rio Grande do Sul: Paulo Afonso Girardi Feijó
- Rondônia: João Aparecido Cahulla
- Roraima: Vacant
- Santa Catarina:
  - Leonel Pavan (until 25 March)
  - Vacant thereafter
- São Paulo:
  - Alberto Goldman (until 2 April)
  - Vacant thereafter
- Sergipe: Belivaldo Chagas Silva
- Tocantins: Eduardo Machado Silva

== Events ==
=== January ===
- December 30 (2009) – January 6: Floods and landslides cause at least 85 deaths in Rio de Janeiro. More than 4,000 people are forced to evacuate their homes.
- January 1: The new minimum wage takes effect (510 reals a month).
- January 12: Humanitarian and aid worker, Zilda Arns is killed by the 2010 Haiti earthquake. She was there carrying out humanitarian activities on behalf of Pastoral da Criança.

=== February ===
- February 11: José Roberto Arruda, Governor of the Federal District, is arrested by Federal Police, after accusations of corruption.
- February 17: Sinking of the Concordia.

=== April ===
- April 5: Starting on April 5 until the middle of the month, another series of floods and mudslides in Rio de Janeiro, causes at least 249 deaths, 161 injuries, and over 15,000 homeless. Property damage is estimated to be around R$23.76 billion (estimated to be around US$4.636 billion).
- April 15: 2010 IBSA summit.
- April 16: 2nd BRIC summit.

=== May ===
- May 8: Miss Brasil 2010.

=== June ===
- June 7: The construction firm TWS announces the construction of the Tour Geneve, which will feature 51 floors. It will be the first skyscraper in Brazil to have over 50 floors since the construction of the Mirante do Vale in 1960.

=== August ===
- August 1: Beginning of the 2010 Census by the IBGE; which ends on October 31.
- August 21: Vila Prudente on Line 2 (Green) opens as an assisted operation from Monday to Friday from 9:30 am to 4:00 pm.

=== October ===
- October 3: General elections for president, governor, senator, state deputy, federal deputy, district deputy (only for the Federal District), and deputy of the Mercosur Parliament.
- October 31:
  - Dilma Vana Rousseff is elected President of Brazil in the second round of general elections.
  - End of the 2010 Brazilian census.

=== November ===
- November 21–28: Criminal drug trafficking factions in Rio de Janeiro initiate a series of attacks in response to the government placing permanent police forces in the favelas.

== Deaths ==
=== January ===
- January 12:
  - Zilda Arns, pediatracian and aid worker (born 1934)
  - Luiz Carlos da Costa, diplomat (born 1949)
- January 28: José Eugênio Corrêa, Roman Catholic Bishop of Caratinga (1957–1978) (born 1914)

=== February ===
- February 10: Armando Falcão, Justice Minister (1974–1979) (born 1919)
- February 28: José Mindlin, businessman and bibliophile (born 1914)

=== March ===
- March 4: Johnny Alf, singer and composer (born 1929)

=== April ===
- April 30: José Fragelli, governor of Mato Grosso (1970–1974) and Senate president (1985–1987) (born 1915)

=== May ===
- May 13: Cinthia Régia Gomes do Livramento, Education Secretary (Amazonas) (born 1964)

=== June ===
- June 7: Viana Junior, comedian (born 1942)

=== July ===
- July 3: Roberto Piva, poet and writer (born 1937)
- July 12: Paulo Moura, saxophonist and clarinetist (born 1932)

=== August ===
- August 29: Ary Fernandes, filmmaker (born 1931)

=== September ===
- September 14: Paulo Machado de Carvalho Filho, businessman and founder of Jovem Pan Radio (born 1924)

== Elections ==
- Brazilian general election, 2010
- Brazilian gubernatorial elections, 2010
- Opinion polling in the Brazilian presidential election, 2010

== Founded ==
- Revista Autismo magazine.
- Revista Santástico magazine.
- Rádio Santos and Santos TV.
- Canal Viva TV channel.
- Universidade Federal da Integração Latino-Americana university.
- Cidade Nova Station subway station.
- Funvic Brasilinvest-São José dos Campos cycling team.
- Liga Brasileira de Futebol Americano, American football league.
- Whitejets airline.

=== Football Clubs ===
- Cordino Esporte Clube, Foz Cataratas Futebol Clube, Igreja Nova Futebol Clube, Novoperário Futebol Clube, Clube Atlético Portal, São José Esporte Clube (women) and União Frederiquense de Futebol

== Film ==
- List of Brazilian films of 2010
- List of 2010 box office number-one films in Brazil

== Television ==
=== Debuted ===
- Busão do Brasil
- El clon Spanish remake of O Clone
- Escrito nas Estrelas
- Passione (telenovela)
- Por Um Fio
- Ribeirão do Tempo
- The Buzz
- Uma Rosa com Amor

=== Ended ===
- Bela, a Feia
- Busão do Brasil
- Cama de Gato
- Caras & Bocas
- El clon
- Escrito nas Estrelas
- Poder Paralelo
- Topa ou Não Topa
- Uma Rosa com Amor
- Seize the Day

== Music ==
- João Lucas & Marcelo form.
- Fellini stop performing.
- First year of SWU Music & Arts

== Sport ==
=== Football ===
- 2010 in Brazilian football
- 2010 Copa Libertadores Finals
- Brazil at the 2010 FIFA World Cup
- 2010 Copa Libertadores Femenina
- 2010 Torneio Internacional Cidade de São Paulo de Futebol Feminino

=== Tennis ===
- 2010 Brasil Open
- 2010 BH Tennis Open International Cup
- 2010 Aberto de Brasília
- 2010 Aberto de Bahia

=== Racing ===
- 2010 Brazilian Grand Prix
- 2010 São Paulo Indy 300
- 2010 Rally International of Curitiba
- 2010 FIA GT1 Interlagos round
- 2010 Desafio Internacional das Estrelas
- 2010 FIA WTCC Race of Brazil
- 2010 Formula 3 Brazil Open
- 2010 GT Brasil season
- 2010 Stock Car Brasil season
- 2010 Copa Chevrolet Montana season
- 2010 Fórmula Truck season
- 2010 Formula 3 Sudamericana season
- 2010 Trofeo Linea season

=== Misc ===
- 2010 Panamerican Men's Youth Handball Championship
- 2010 USA-Brazil Challenge
- Brazil at the 2010 Winter Olympics
- Brazil at the 2010 Summer Youth Olympics
- Brazil participate in the 2010 South American Rugby Championship "A"

== See also ==
- 2010 in Brazilian football
