= Igreja Nova =

Igreja Nova means "New Church" in Portuguese and may refer to:

- Igreja Nova, Alagoas, a city in Alagoas, Brazil
- Igreja Nova (Barcelos), a parish in Barcelos Municipality, Portugal
- Igreja Nova (Mafra), a parish in the Mafra Municipality, Portugal
