= State legislative assemblies of Brazil =

State-level legislature

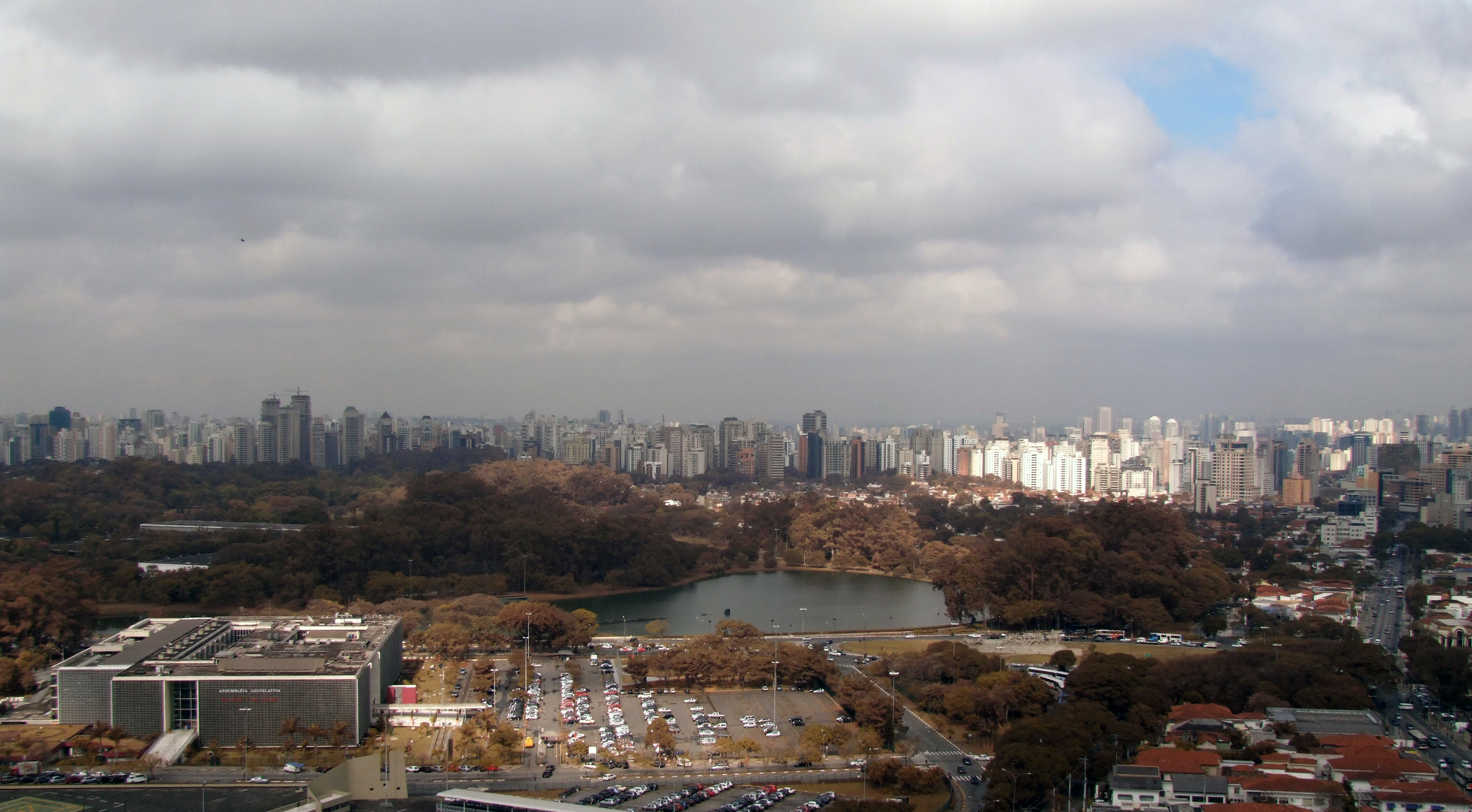
Legislative Assembly of São Paulo and Ibirapuera Park

In Brazil, a Legislative Assembly is the state-level legislature. All legislative assemblies are unicameral, with elected members who are designated as State Deputies, and who serve four-year terms.

In the Federal District, which is not a state, the analogue is the Legislative Chamber of the Federal District, with elected members designated as district deputies. Its name represents a mixture of legislative assembly (legislative body of the other units of the federation) and municipal chamber (legislative body of the municipalities).

== State legislatures and legislative chamber ==
Name	Foundation	Deputies	Website
Legislative Assembly of Acre	13 June 1962	24 state deputies	www.al.ac.leg.br
Legislative Assembly of Alagoas	12 February 1835	27 state deputies	www.al.al.leg.br
Legislative Assembly of Amapá	1 February 1991	22 state deputies	www.al.ap.gov.br
Legislative Assembly of Amazonas	7 September 1852	24 state deputies	www.ale.am.gov.br
Legislative Assembly of Bahia	12 August 1834	63 state deputies	www.al.ba.gov.br
Legislative Assembly of Ceará	7 April 1835	46 state deputies	www.al.ce.gov.br
Legislative Chamber of the Federal District	1 February 1991	24 district deputies	www.cl.df.gov.br
Legislative Assembly of Espírito Santo	1 February 1835	30 state deputies	www.al.es.gov.br
Legislative Assembly of Goiás	1 June 1835	41 state deputies	www.al.go.leg.br
Legislative Assembly of Maranhão	16 February 1835	42 state deputies	www.al.ma.leg.br
Legislative Assembly of Mato Grosso	3 July 1835	24 state deputies	www.al.mt.gov.br
Legislative Assembly of Mato Grosso do Sul	13 July 1979	24 state deputies	www.al.ms.gov.br
Legislative Assembly of Minas Gerais	31 February 1835	78 state deputies	www.almg.gov.br
Legislative Assembly of Pará	12 March 1885	41 state deputies	www.alepa.pa.gov.br
Legislative Assembly of Paraíba	7 April 1835	36 state deputies	www.al.pb.leg.br
Legislative Assembly of Paraná	19 December 1853	54 state deputies	www.alep.pr.gov.br
Legislative Assembly of Pernambuco	1 April 1835	49 state deputies	www.alepe.pe.gov.br
Legislative Assembly of Piauí	4 May 1835	30 state Deputies	www.alepi.pi.gov.br
Legislative Assembly of Rio de Janeiro	15 March 1975	71 state deputies	www.alerj.rj.gov.br
Legislative Assembly of Rio Grande do Norte	2 February 1835	24 state deputies	www.al.rn.gov.br
Legislative Assembly of Rio Grande do Sul	20 April 1835	55 state deputies	www.al.rs.gov.br
Legislative Assembly of Rondônia	31 January 1983	24 state deputies	www.al.ro.leg.br
Legislative Assembly of Roraima	1 February 1991	24 state deputies	www.al.rr.leg.br
Legislative Assembly of Santa Catarina	1 March 1835	40 state deputies	www.al.sc.gov.br
Legislative Assembly of Sergipe	2 February 1835	24 state deputies	www.al.se.gov.br
Legislative Assembly of São Paulo	2 February 1835	94 state deputies	www.al.sp.gov.br
Legislative Assembly of Tocantins	1 February 1991	24 state deputies	www.al.to.gov.br
