= Calandrini =

Calandrini is an Italian surname. Notable people with this surname include:

- Filippo Calandrini (1403–1476), Italian Roman Catholic cardinal and half-brother of Pope Nicholas V;
- Jean-Louis Calandrini (1703–1758), Genevan scientist;
- Alline Calandrini (born 1988), commonly known as Calan, Brazilian sports journalist and former football defender.
