= List of Brazilian films of 2010 =

A list of Brazilian films released in 2010:

== 2010 releases ==
Title	Director	Cast	Genre	Notes
400 Contra 1 - Uma História do Crime Organizado	Caco Souza	Daniel de Oliveira, Rodrigo Brassoloto, Jefferson Brasil, Daniela Escobar	Thriller	
5x Favela - Agora por Nós Mesmos	Cacau Amaral, Cadu Barcelos, Luciana Bezerra, Luciano Vidigal, Manaira Carneiro, Rodrigo Felha, Wagner Novais	Flávio Bauraqui, Zózimo Bulbul, Vitor Carvalho, Hugo Carvana, Samuel de Assis	Drama	
As Melhores Coisas do Mundo	Laís Bodanzky	Caio Blat, Denise Fraga, Fiuk, Zécarlos Machado, Gustavo Machado, Paulo Vilhena	Drama, Comedy	
Bellini and the Devil	Marcelo Galvão	Fábio Assunção	Drama	
Chico Xavier	Daniel Filho	Nelson Xavier, Christiane Torloni, Giulia Gam, Letícia Sabatella, Giovanna Antonelli, Tony Ramos.	Drama, bio-pic	
Elite Squad: The Enemy Within	José Padilha	Wagner Moura, Milhem Cortaz, Maria Ribeiro, Irandhir Santos, André Mattos	Crime, drama	The all-time largest box office ticket seller and highest-grossing film in Brazil. The film was selected as the Brazilian entry for the Best Foreign Language Film at the 84th Academy Awards, but it did not make the final shortlist.
Os Inquilinos	Sergio Bianchi	Pascoal da Conceição, Marat Descartes, Leona Cavalli	Drama	Winner of best screenplay at the Festival do Rio
O Bem Amado	Guel Arraes	Marco Nanini, Maria Flor, Caio Blat, José Wilker, Andréa Beltrão, Matheus Nachtergaele, Tonico Pereira	Comedy	
Olhos Azuis	José Joffily	David Rasche, Cristina Lago, Irandhir Santos	Drama	
Os Famosos e os Duendes da Morte	Esmir Filho	Adriana Seiffert, Áurea Baptista, Samuel Reginatto, Tuane Eggers	Drama	
Quincas Berro D'Água	Sérgio Machado	Mariana Ximenes, Marieta Severo, Paulo José	Comedy	Based on the Brazilian Modernist novella The Two Deaths of Quincas Wateryell by Jorge Amado
Reflexões de um Liquidificador	André Klotzel	Selton Mello, Ana Lúcia Torre, Aramis Trindade, Eduardo Sofiati	Drama, comedy	
Terra Deu, Terra Come	Rodrigo Siqueira		Documentary	
Uma Noite em 67	Renato Terra, Ricardo Calil	Chico Buarque, Nelson Motta, Gilberto Gil, Caetano Veloso, Roberto Carlos	Documentary	
Viajo Porque Preciso, Volto Porque Te Amo	Karim Ainouz, Marcelo Gomes	Irandhir Santos, Jose Renato Lana	Drama	

== See also ==
- 2010 in Brazil
- 2010 in Brazilian television
- List of 2010 box office number-one films in Brazil
