= Igreja Nova Futebol Clube =

Igreja Nova
- Full name: Igreja Nova Futebol Clube
- Nickname: Tetracolor
- Founded: 2010
- Ground: Estádio Alfredo Leahy
- Capacity: 5,000
- 2013: Alagoano 2ª Divisão, 11th of 11
Home colors	Away colors

Igreja Nova Futebol Clube was a Brazilian football club based in Igreja Nova, Alagoas. The team last participated in the Campeonato Alagoano Segunda Divisão in the 2013 season.

The club was formerly known as Penedo Futebol Clube.

== History ==
The club was founded as Penedo Futebol Clube and at the time it was based in Penedo, then founded again in 2010 as Igreja Nova Futebol Clube after moving to Igreja Nova city. They competed in the Campeonato Alagoano Second Level in 2010, when they finished in the fifth position. Despite being based in Igreja Nova, they played in 2010 in Penedo.

== Stadium ==
Igreja Nova Futebol Clube play their home games at Estádio Alfredo Leahy, in Penedo. The stadium has a maximum capacity of 5,000 people.
