= Alline Calandrini =

Brazilian footballer (born 1988)

Calan
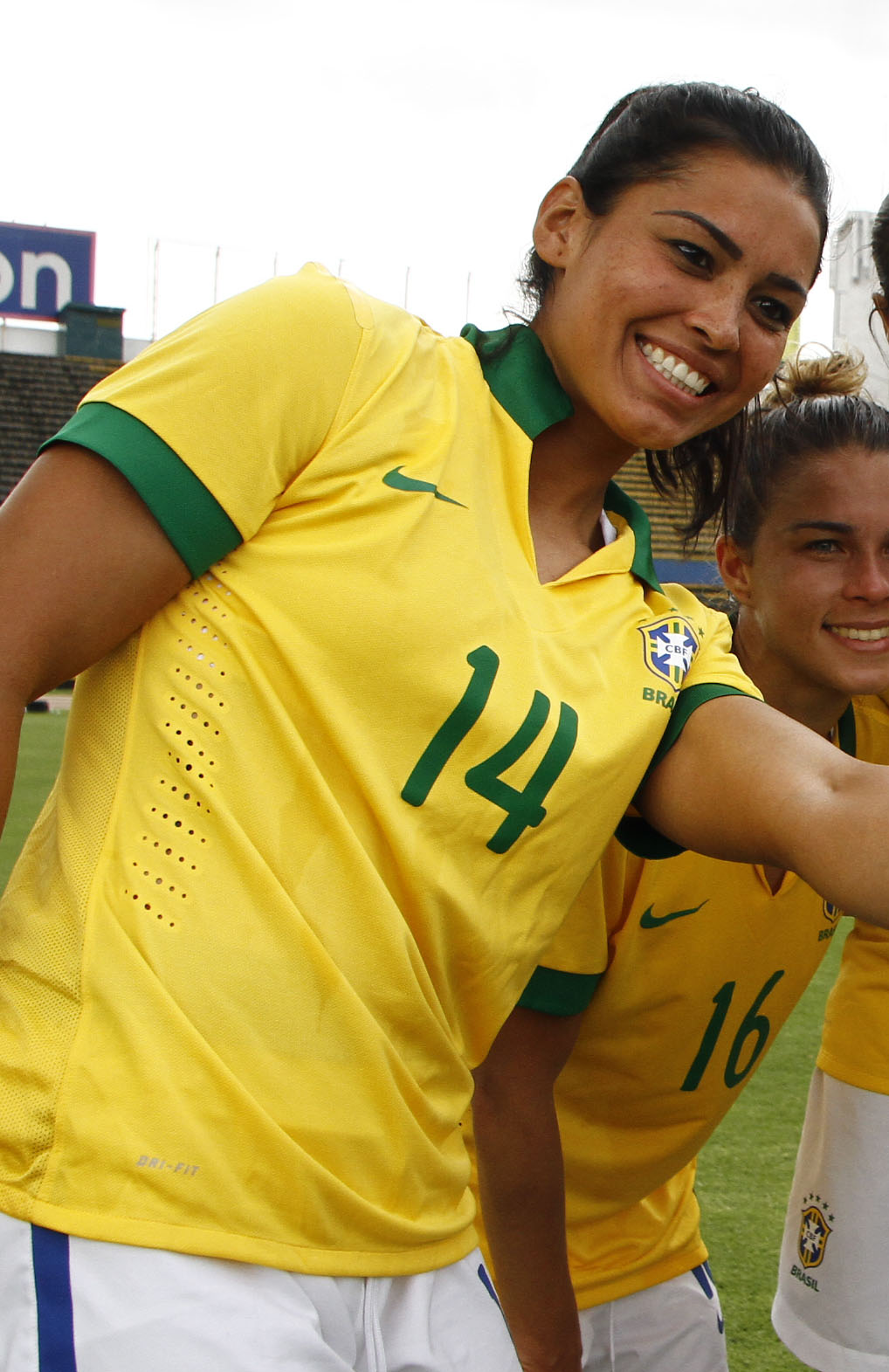
- Calan (14) at the 2014 Copa América Femenina

Personal information
- Full name: Alline Miranda Calandrini de Azevedo
- Date of birth: 8 March 1988 (age 38)
- Place of birth: Macapá, Brazil
- Height: 1.72 m (5 ft 8 in)
- Position: Defender

Senior career*
Years	Team	Apps	(Gls)
2005	Juventus		
2006–2011	Santos		
2012–2014	Centro Olímpico		
2015–2017	Santos		
2018	Corinthians		

International career^{‡}
2013–2014	Brazil	8	(0)
- * Club domestic league appearances and goals as of 19:10, 31 December 2018 (UTC) ‡ National team caps and goals as of 19:10, 31 December 2018 (UTC)

Alline Miranda Calandrini de Azevedo (born 8 March 1988), commonly known as Calan, (Note: A shortened version of her surname, adopted by Santos coach Kleiton Lima to distinguish her from teammate Aline.) is a Brazilian sports journalist and former football defender who played for the Brazil women's national team. She played for Santos, Centro Olímpico and Corinthians.

== Club career ==
Calan began playing football at six years old. Her first professional club was Juventus, from where she progressed to Santos. Santos won the Copa Libertadores Femenina in 2009 and 2010, but in early 2012 Santos' board of directors scrapped the women's section, to save money after handing their male player Neymar a large new contract. Ten of the displaced players moved to Centro Olímpico, including Calan, who had to give up her house in Santos to move to a shared flat in São Paulo.

When Santos reinstated their women's team in 2015, Calan returned as captain. She sustained a serious injury in 2016 and did not play at all in 2017 as she was taking part in a reality television series. In February 2018 she transferred to Corinthians. In August 2018 she announced her retirement from playing, to focus on her career as a sports journalist.

== International career ==
Calan was part of the Brazil under-20 selection at the 2008 South American U-20 Women's Championship and subsequent 2008 FIFA U-20 Women's World Cup.

When Calan's Santos coach Kleiton Lima took the Brazil women's national football team job in March 2009, he named her in his first squad for a friendly against Germany in Frankfurt. She was present on the substitutes' bench, but did not appear in the match.

Calan was called up by the national team again in August 2013. She made a first appearance for Brazil in September 2013, in a 1–0 win over Mexico at the 2013 Valais Women's Cup.

Despite featuring in Brazil's successful 2014 Copa América Femenina campaign, Calan was not selected for the 2015 FIFA Women's World Cup or the 2015 Pan American Games. When she was ruled out for six months with damaged knee ligaments in August 2016, she recognised that the squad for the 2016 Rio Olympics was already "closed", but hoped to regain her national team place afterwards.

She was pleasantly surprised to be invited to national team training upon her recovery in January 2017, but exceptionally frustrated when she re-injured the same knee shortly afterwards and was unable to attend.

== Personal life ==
While playing football Calan also trained as a broadcast journalist, inspired by Glenda Kozlowski. While playing for Santos she appeared as a presenter on Santos TV. Sometimes described as a muse, it was reported that Calan's good looks brought her wider attention and a dedicated social media following. As a young player she was annoyed by the "musa" label and wanted respect as an athlete. In later years she did not allow it to unsettle her or detract from her football. During her career she rejected transfer offers from foreign clubs, preferring to remain in Brazil.
