= Roberto Piva =

Brazilian poet and writer

Roberto Piva (September 25, 1937, São Paulo – July 3, 2010, São Paulo) was a Brazilian poet and writer. He died from complications from Parkinson's disease.

== Bibliography ==
Booklet

- Ode a Fernando Pessoa, 1961

Individual works

- Paranóia, 1963
- Piazzas, 1964
- Abra os olhos e diga ah!, 1975
- Coxas, 1979
- 20 Poemas com Brócoli, 1981
- Antologia Poética, 1985
- Ciclones, 1997
- Um Estrangeiro na Legião: obras reunidas, volume 1, 2005
- Mala na Mão & Asas Pretas: obras reunidas, volume 2, 2006
- Estranhos Sinais de Saturno: obras reunidas, volume 3, 2008
