= Results of the 2010 Brazilian general election =

The 2010 Brazilian general election saw Dilma Rousseff of the Workers' Party (PT) elected president.

== President ==
Candidate	Running mate	Party	First round		Second round	
Candidate	Running mate	Party	Votes	%	Votes	%
Dilma Rousseff	Michel Temer (PMDB)	Workers' Party	47,651,434	46.91	55,752,529	56.05
José Serra	Indio da Costa (DEM)	Brazilian Social Democracy Party	33,132,283	32.61	43,711,388	43.95
Marina Silva	Guilherme Leal	Green Party	19,636,359	19.33		
Plínio de Arruda Sampaio	Hamilton Assis	Socialism and Liberty Party	886,816	0.87		
José Maria Eymael	José Paulo Neto	Christian Social Democratic Party	89,350	0.09		
José Maria de Almeida	Cláudia Durans	United Socialist Workers' Party	84,609	0.08		
Levy Fidelix	Luiz Eduardo Duarte	Brazilian Labour Renewal Party	57,960	0.06		
Ivan Pinheiro	Edmilson Costa	Brazilian Communist Party	39,136	0.04		
Rui Costa Pimenta	Edson Dorta	Workers' Cause Party	12,206	0.01		
Total			101,590,153	100.00	99,463,917	100.00
Valid votes			101,590,153	91.36	99,463,917	93.30
Invalid/blank votes			9,603,594	8.64	7,142,025	6.70
Total votes			111,193,747	100.00	106,605,942	100.00
Registered voters/turnout			135,804,433	81.88	135,804,084	78.50
Source: Election Resources

=== By state ===
==== First round ====
States/districts won by Dilma Rousseff
States/districts won by José Serra
States/districts won by Marina Silva

State	Electorate	Abstention	%	Dilma	%	Serra	%	Marina	%	Others	%	Blank votes	%	Null votes	%
Acre	470,445	106,879	22,72%	82,732	23,92%	180,252	52,13%	81,081	23,45%	1,734	0,51%	3,812	1,05%	13,920	3,83%
Alagoas	2,033,483	449,639	22,11%	709,844	50,92%	508,232	36,46%	160,380	11,50%	15,623	1,12%	57,821	3,65%	131,944	8,33%
Amapá	420,331	62,539	14,88%	161,443	47,38%	72,774	21,36%	101,243	29,71%	5,280	1,54%	3,630	1,01%	13,422	3,75%
Amazonas	2,028,122	406,174	20,03%	991,128	64,98%	129,190	8,47%	392,170	25,71%	12,686	0,84%	21,312	1,31%	75,462	4,65%
Bahia	9,544,368	2,057,633	21,56%	4,188,099	62,62%	1,403,153	20,98%	1,052,674	15,74%	43,975	0,66%	221,801	2,96%	577,033	7,71%
Ceará	5,878,066	1,178,631	20,05%	2,783,451	66,30%	686,891	16,36%	686,770	16,36%	41,399	0,99%	140,365	2,99%	360,559	7,67%
Espírito Santo	2,521,991	438,946	17,40%	717,417	37,25%	682,590	35,44%	505,734	26,26%	20,150	1,05%	62,569	3,00%	94,585	4,54%
Federal District	1,833,942	283,177	15,44%	462,441	31,74%	354,070	24,30%	611,362	41,96%	29,186	2,01%	33,674	2,17%	60,032	3,87%
Goiás	4,058,912	729,276	17,97%	1,301,985	42,23%	1,217,203	39,48%	529,694	17,18%	33,911	1,10%	84,858	2,55%	161,985	4,86%
Maranhão	4,320,748	1,035,648	23,97%	2,079,650	70,65%	444,145	15,09%	400,048	13,59%	19,936	0,69%	67,827	2,06%	273,494	8,33%
Mato Grosso	2,094,032	438,820	20,96%	659,771	42,94%	678,614	44,16%	184,339	12,00%	13,869	0,91%	32,728	1,98%	85,891	5,19%
Mato Grosso do Sul	1,700,912	308,448	18,13%	518,877	39,86%	551,296	42,35%	219,812	16,88%	11,864	0,90%	26,786	1,92%	63,829	4,58%
Minas Gerais	14,513,934	2,675,492	18,43%	5,067,399	46,98%	3,317,872	30,76%	2,291,502	21,25%	108,815	1,02%	418,468	3,53%	634,386	5,36%
Pará	4,763,456	1,008,763	21,18%	1,699,799	47,93%	1,336,887	37,70%	474,841	13,39%	35,057	0,99%	66,727	1,78%	141,361	3,76%
Paraíba	2,738,313	506,052	18,48%	1,031,185	53,21%	551,053	28,43%	341,916	17,64%	13,832	0,71%	80,528	3,61%	213,747	9,58%
Paraná	7,597,999	1,250,376	16,46%	2,311,239	38,94%	2,607,664	43,94%	944,402	15,91%	71,696	1,22%	163,486	2,58%	249,136	3,92%
Pernambuco	6,256,213	1,214,277	19,41%	2,748,751	61,74%	773,374	20,30%	903,655	17,37%	26,152	0,59%	204,176	4,05%	385,828	7,65%
Piauí	2,261,862	448,538	19,83%	1,088,205	67,09%	339,445	20,93%	185,107	11,41%	9,284	0,58%	36,380	2,01%	154,903	8,54%
Rio de Janeiro	11,584,083	2,011,597	17,37%	3,739,632	43,76%	1,925,166	22,53%	2,693,130	31,52%	187,147	2,19%	368,193	3,85%	659,218	6,89%
Rio Grande do Norte	2,245,135	367,434	16,37%	846,416	51,76%	460,107	28,14%	313,360	19,16%	15,280	0,93%	75,552	4,02%	166,966	8,89%
Rio Grande do Sul	8,107,550	1,204,648	14,86%	3,007,263	46,95%	2,600,389	40,59%	725,580	11,33%	72,529	1,13%	266,304	3,86%	230,837	3,34%
Rondônia	1,078,348	231,905	21,51%	321,464	40,73%	358,389	45,40%	100,292	12,71%	9,196	1,16%	16,532	1,95%	40,144	4,75%
Roraima	271,596	37,980	13,98%	63,927	28,72%	113,601	51,03%	41,784	18,77%	3,309	1,49%	2,725	1,17%	8,270	3,54%
Santa Catarina	4,536,718	636,654	14,03%	1,402,566	38,71%	1,658,161	45,77%	507,017	13,99%	55,385	1,53%	110,605	2,84%	166,330	4,26%
São Paulo	30,289,723	4,979,456	16,44%	8,740,949	37,31%	9,524,050	40,66%	4,865,828	20,77%	295,472	1,26%	856,433	3,38%	1,027,535	4,06%
Sergipe	1,425,334	240,465	16,87%	506,802	47,67%	404,584	38,05%	141,033	13,26%	10,835	1,01%	43,054	3,63%	78,561	6,63%
Tocantins	947,906	175,262	18,49%	362,383	50,98%	198,979	27,99%	146,151	20,56%	3,351	0,47%	9,951	1,29%	51,829	6,71%
Total	135,804,433	24,610,296	18,12%	47,651,434	46,91%	33,132,283	32,61%	19,636,359	19,33%	1,170,077	1,15%	3,479,340	3,13%	6,124,254	5,51%

==== Second round ====
States/districts won by Dilma Rousseff
States/districts won by José Serra

State	Electorate	Abstention	%	Dilma	%	Serra	%	Blank votes	%	Null votes	%
Acre	470,560	134,317	28.54%	96,969	30.33%	222,766	69.67%	3,563	1.06%	12,585	3.75%
Alagoas	2,033,518	536,872	26.40%	737,236	53.63%	637,368	46.37%	32,120	2.15%	89,922	6.01%
Amapá	420,349	81,796	19.46%	198,644	62.66%	118,360	37.34%	4,443	1.31%%	17,106	5.05%
Amazonas	2,028,239	543,726	26.81%	1,141,607	80.57%	275,333	19.43%	30,369	2.05%	37,204	2.51%
Bahia	9,544,691	2,369,486	24.83%	4,737,079	70.85%	1,948,584	29.15%	146,826	2.05%	342,716	4.78%
Ceará	5,878,192	1,358,604	23.11%	3,288,570	77.35%	962,729	22.65%	91,042	2.01%	177,247	3.92%
Espírito Santo	2,522,072	527,745	20.93%	924,046	49.17%	955,423	50.83%	52,573	2.64%	62,285	3.12%
Federal District	1,834,135	354,146	19.31%	708,674	52.81%	633,299	47.19%	45,821	3.10%	92,195	6.23%
Goiás	4,059,028	900,924	22.20%	1,446,178	49.25%	1,490,368	50.75%	61,595	1.95%	159,963	5.07%
Maranhão	4,320,922	1,275,532	29.52%	2,294,146	79.09%	606,449	20.91%	41,114	1.35%	103,364	3.39%
Mato Grosso	2,094,105	545,646	26.06%	729,747	48.89%	762,905	51.11%	20,082	1.30%	35,725	2.31%
Mato Grosso do Sul	1,700,979	410,546	24.14%	555,283	44.87%	682,305	55.13%	19,080	1.48%	33,765	2.62%
Minas Gerais	14,514,385	3,045,244	20.98%	6,220,125	58.45%	4,422,294	41.55%	297,028	2.59%	529,422	4.62%
Pará	4,763,592	1,275,991	26.79%	1,791,443	53.20%	1,576,154	46.80%	40,412	1.16%	79,571	2.28%
Paraíba	2,738,389	521,249	19.03%	1,229,391	61.55%	767,919	38.45%	53,447	2.41%	166,383	7.50%
Paraná	7,598,134	1,491,451	19.63%	2,593,086	44.56%	3,226,216	55.44%	112,620	1.84%	174,761	2.86%
Pernambuco	6,256,384	1,373,943	21.96%	3,457,953	75.65%	1,113,235	24.35%	133,692	2.74%	177,561	3.64%
Piauí	2,261,931	517,245	22.87%	1,112,380	69.98%	477,092	30.02%	26,645	1.53%	128,569	7.37%
Rio de Janeiro	11,584,435	2,436,258	21.03%	4,934,077	60.48%	3,223,891	39.52%	313,497	3.43%	676,712	7.40%
Rio Grande do Norte	2,245,194	483,909	21.55%	979,772	59.54%	665,726	40.46%	40,639	2.31%	75,128	4.27%
Rio Grande do Sul	8,107,785	1,436,185	17.71%	3,117,761	49.06%	3,237,207	50.94%	148,409	2.22%	168,223	2.52%
Rondônia	1,078,402	276,450	25.64%	347,138	47.37%	385,735	52.63%	12,997	1.62%	56,082	6.99%
Roraima	271,603	49,924	18.38%	71,280	33.44%	141,896	66.56%	2,507	1.13%	5,996	2.70%
Santa Catarina	4,536,829	766,246	16.89%	1,556,226	43.39%	2,030,135	56.61%	67,252	1.78%	116,970	3.10%
São Paulo	30,290,443	5,801,614	19.15%	10,462,447	45.95%	12,308,483	54.05%	618,538	2.53%	1,099,361	4.49%
Sergipe	1,425,359	294,968	20.69%	568,862	53.56%	493,280	46.44%	23,787	2.10%	44,462	3.93%
Tocantins	947,928	251,365	26.52%	391,279	58.88%	273,306	41.12%	9,455	1.36%	22,523	3.23%
Total	135,804,433	29,197,152	21,50%	55,752,529	56,05%	43,711,388	43,95%	2,452,597	2,30%	4,689,428	4,40%

=== By municipality ===
██ Municipalities won by Rousseff with less than 65% of the votes
██ Municipalities won by Rousseff with over 65% of the votes
██ Municipalities won by Serra with less than 65% of the votes
██ Municipalities won by Serra with over 65% of the votes

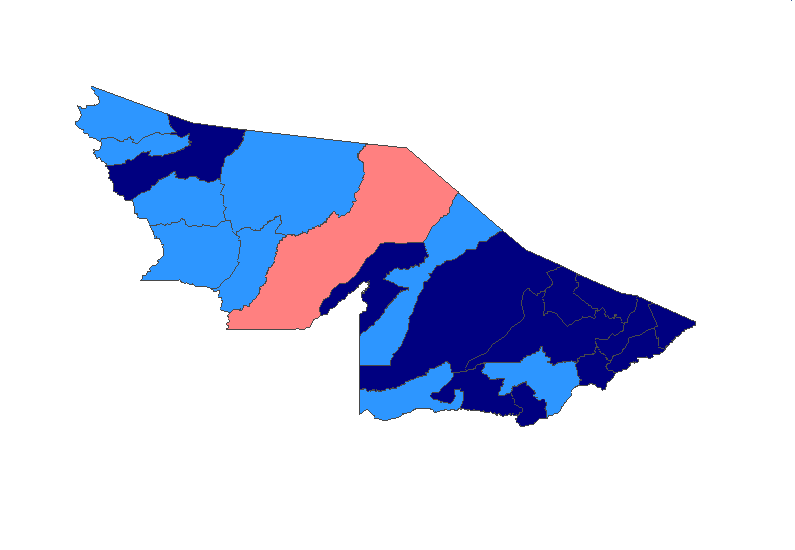
Acre

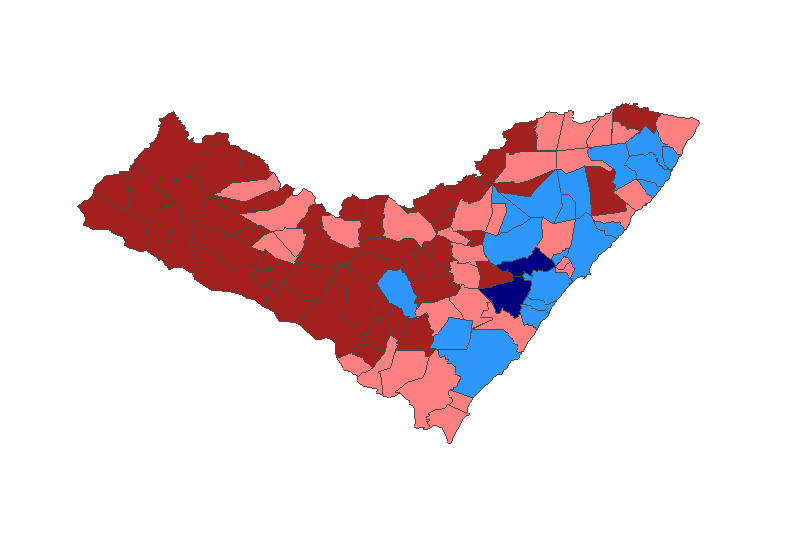
Alagoas

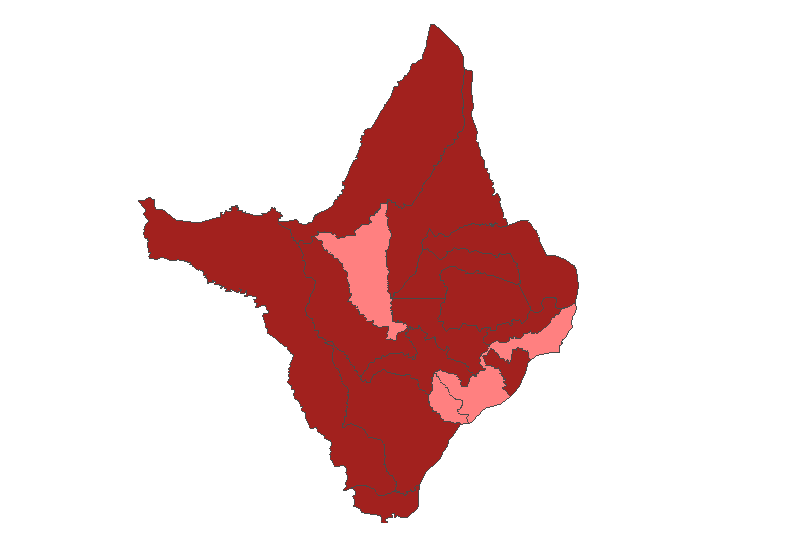
Amapá

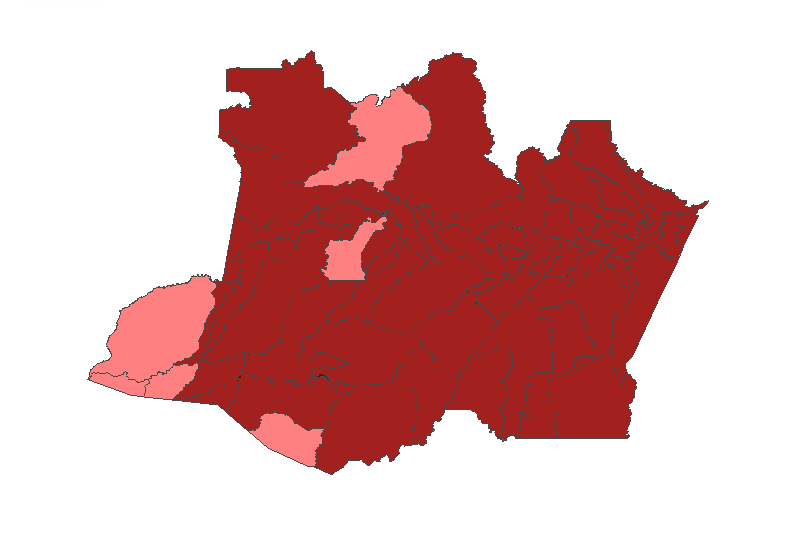
Amazonas

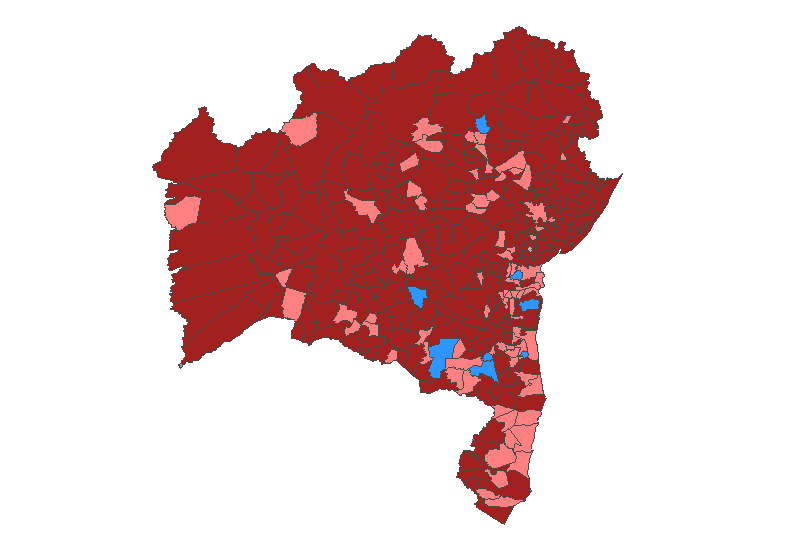
Bahia

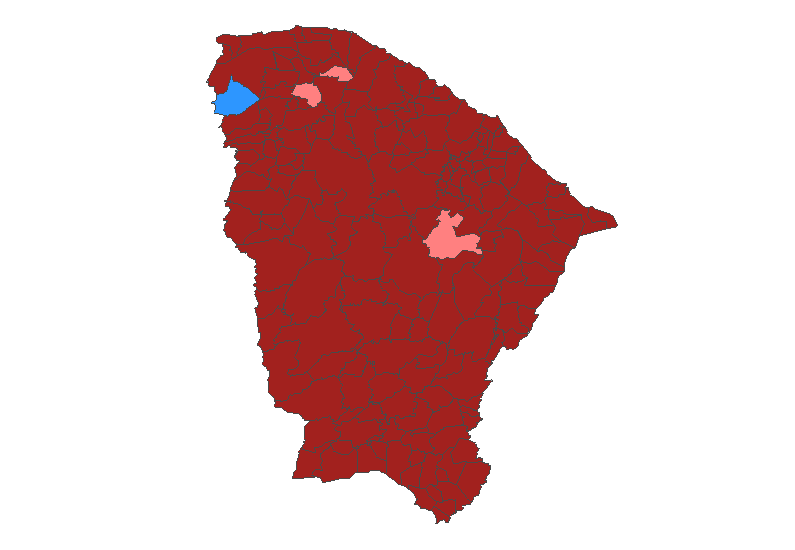
Ceará

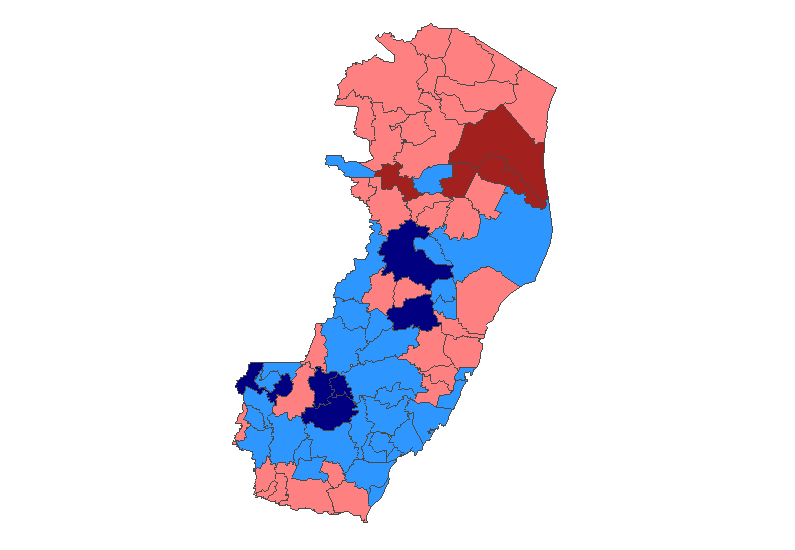
Espírito Santo

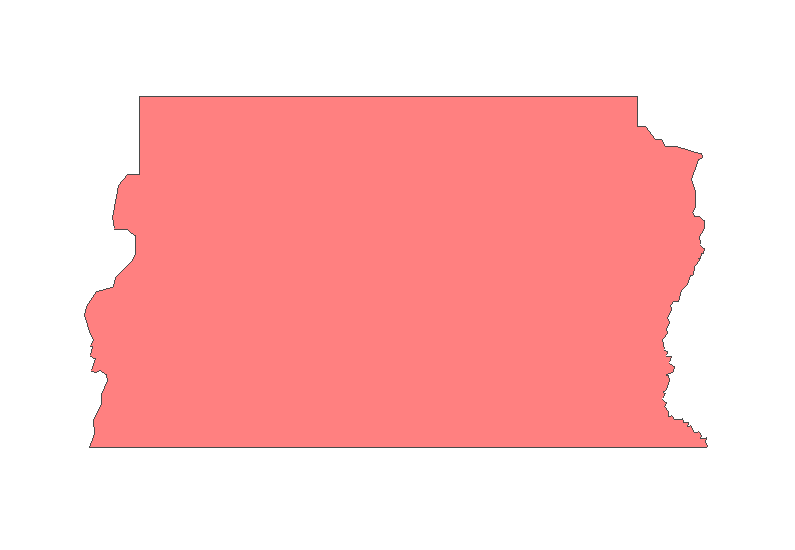
Federal District

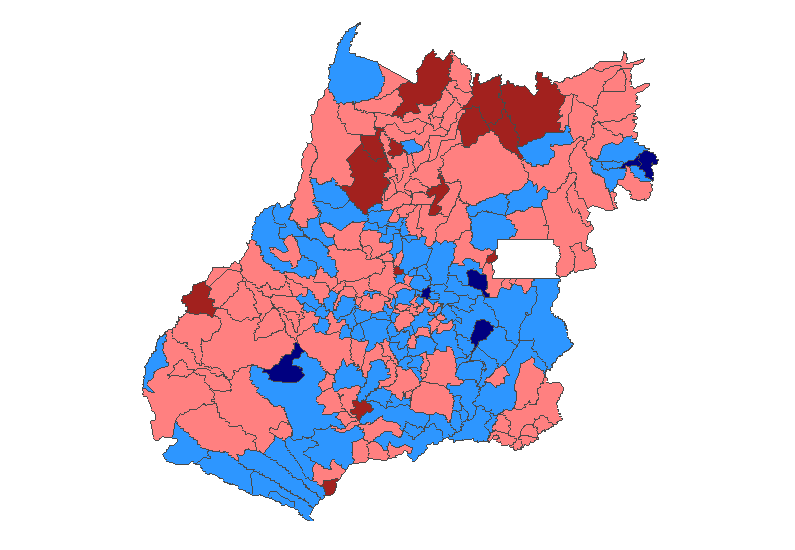
Goiás

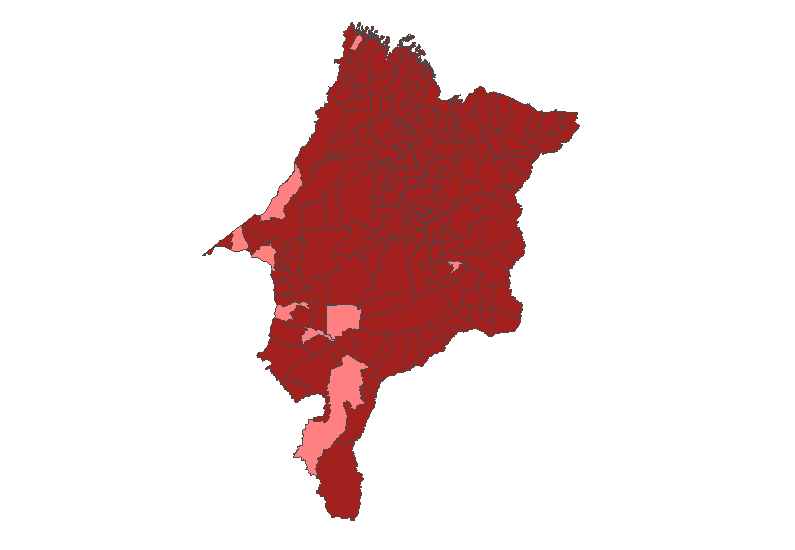
Maranhão

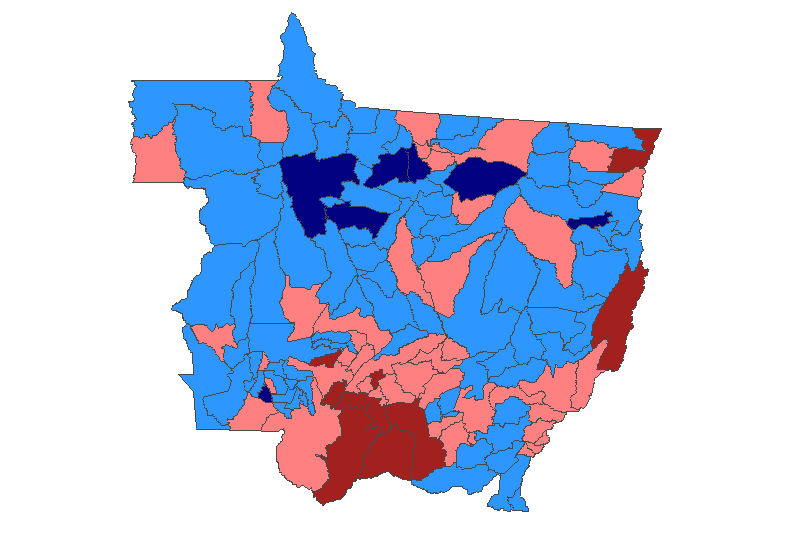
Mato Grosso

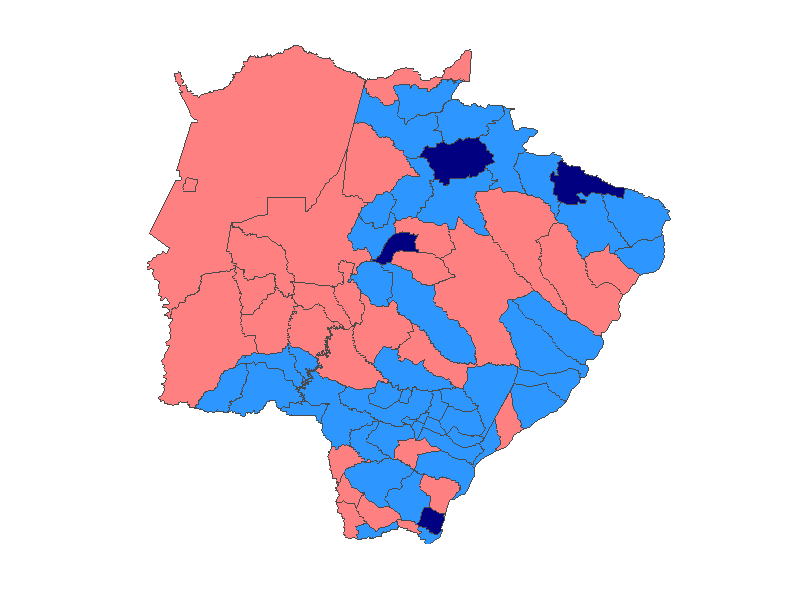
Mato Grosso do Sul

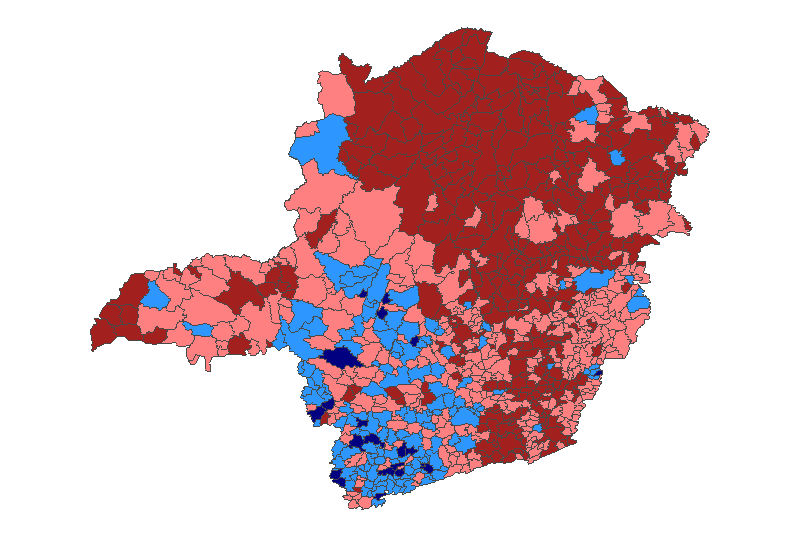
Minas Gerais

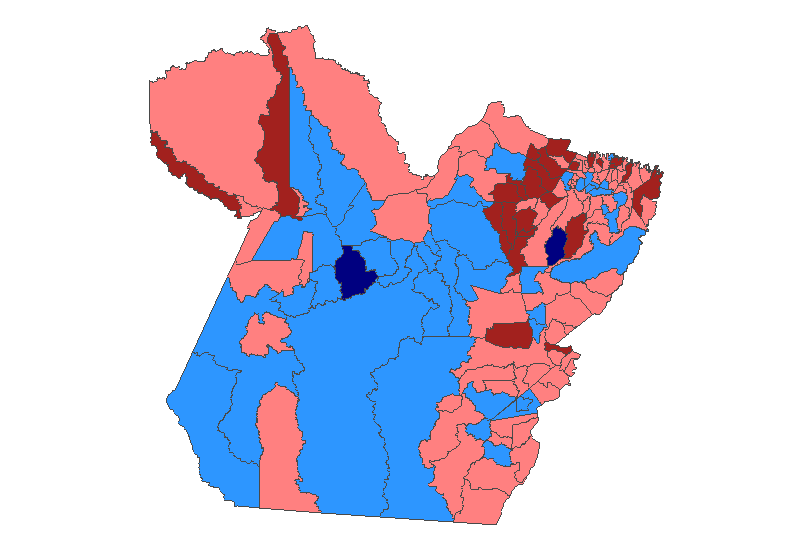
Pará

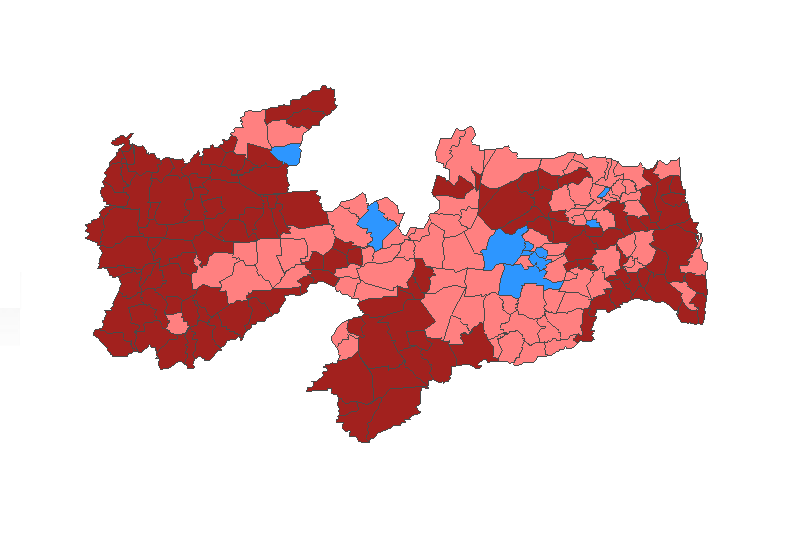
Paraíba

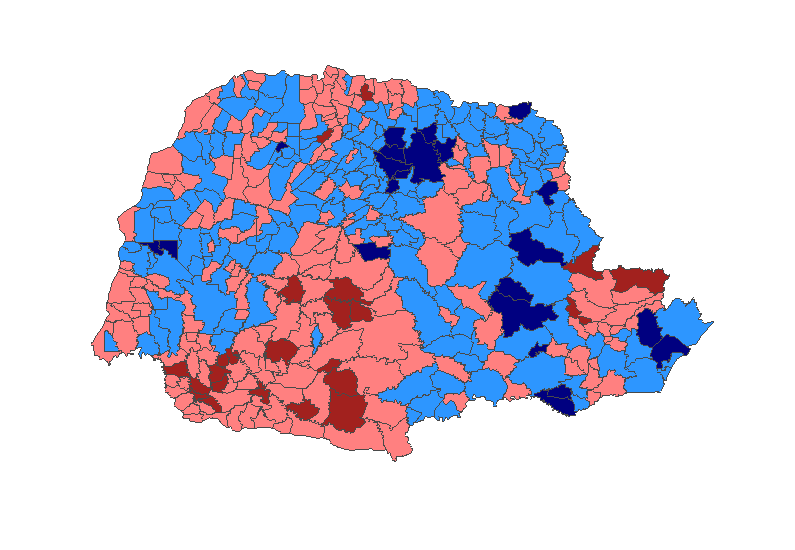
Paraná

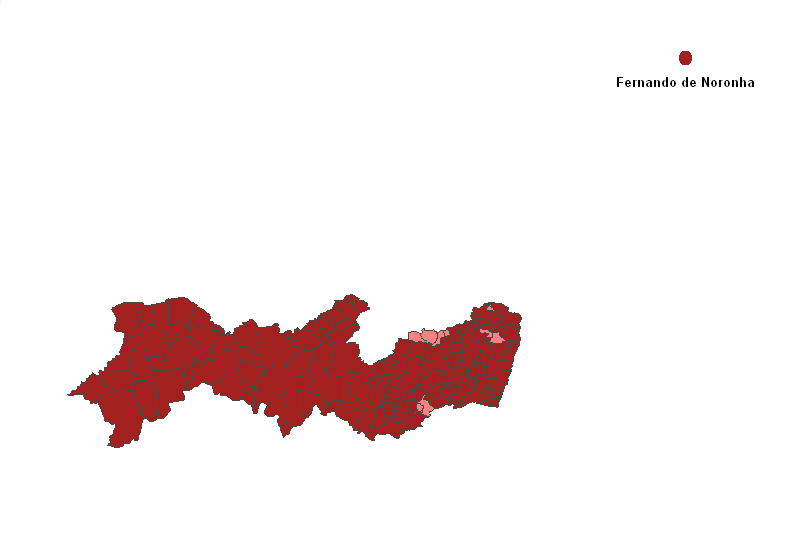
Pernambuco

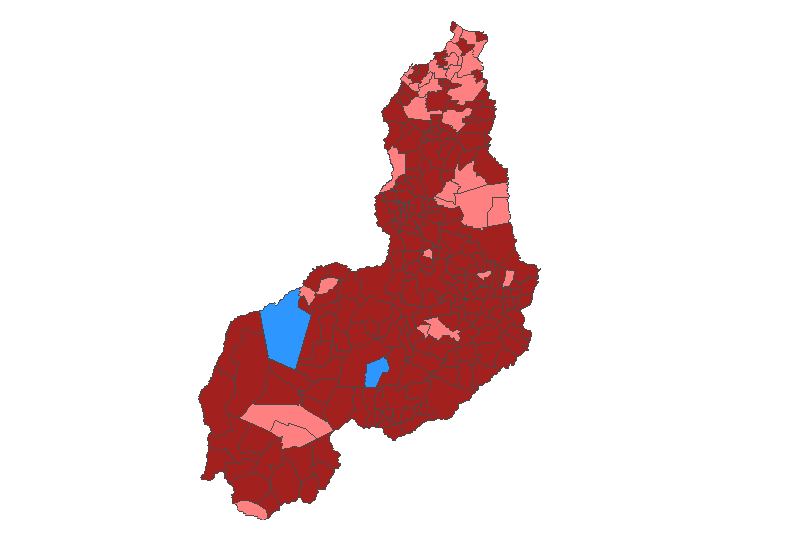
Piauí

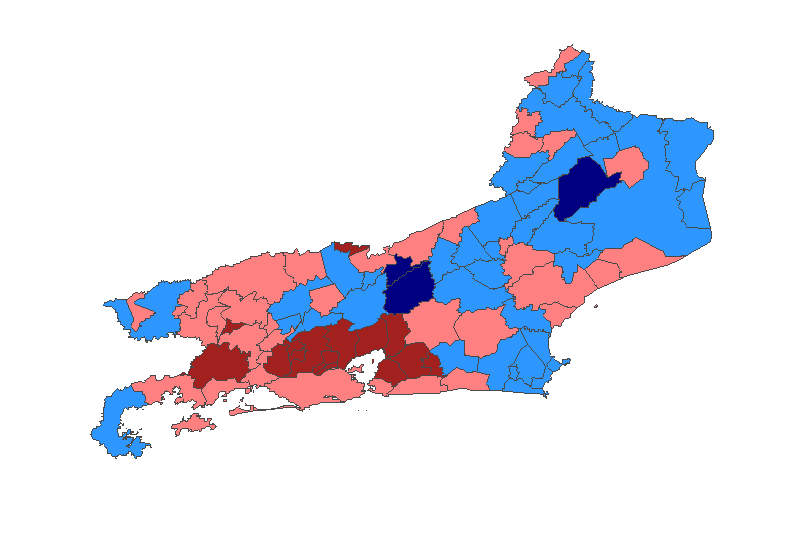
Rio de Janeiro

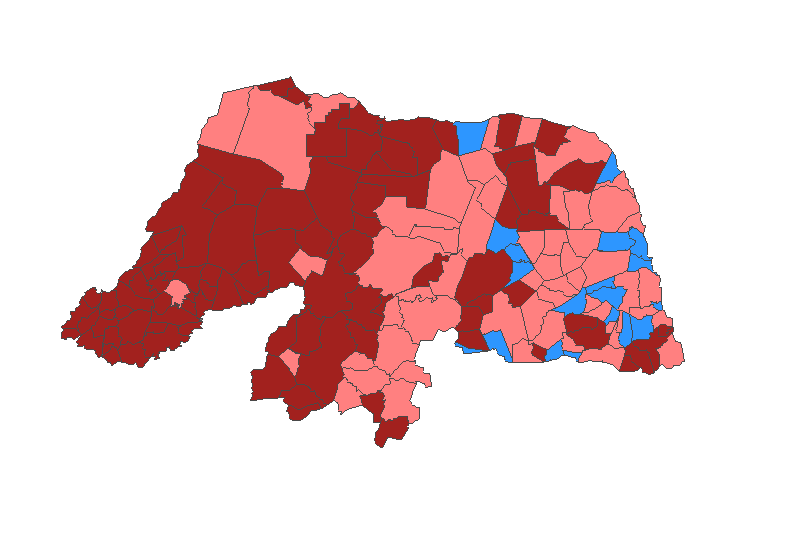
Rio Grande do Norte

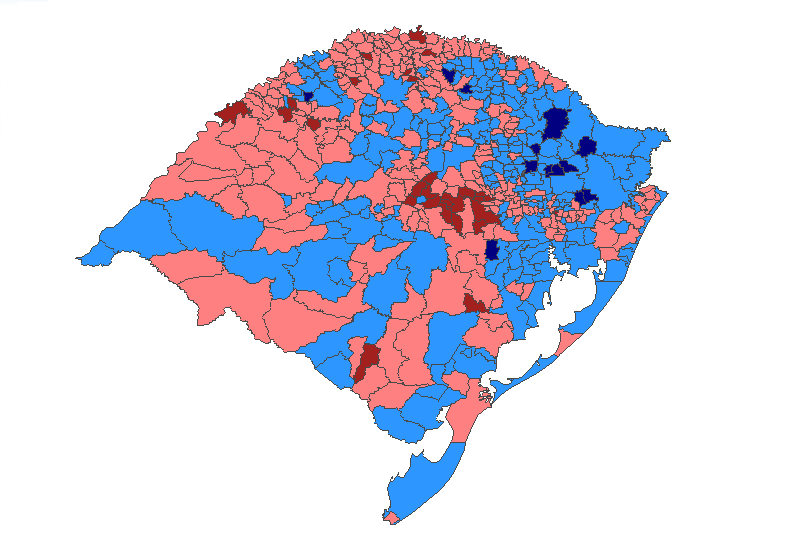
Rio Grande do Sul

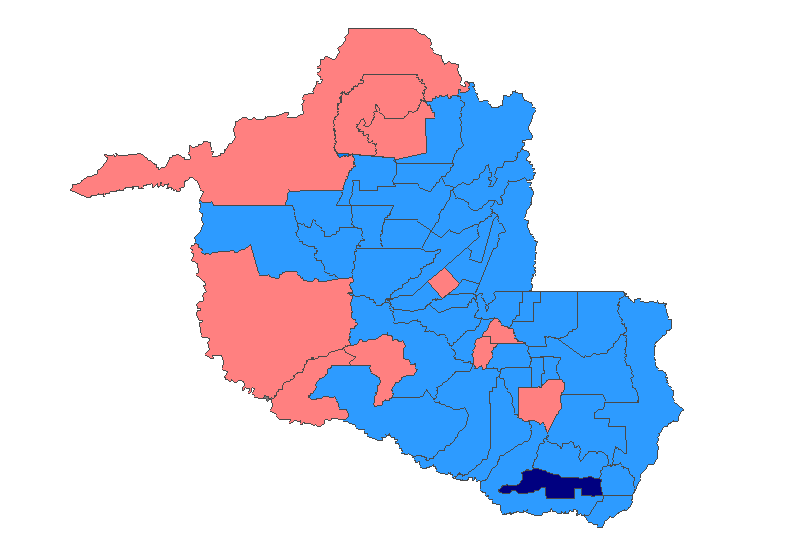
Rondônia

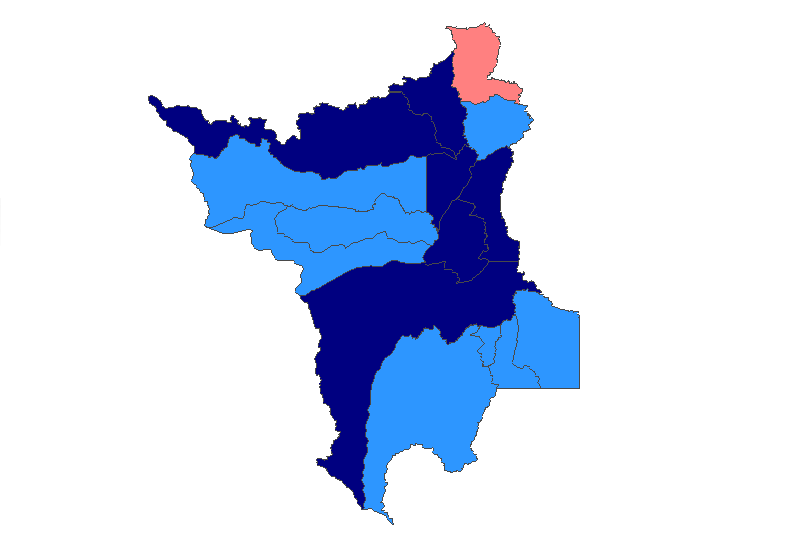
Roraima

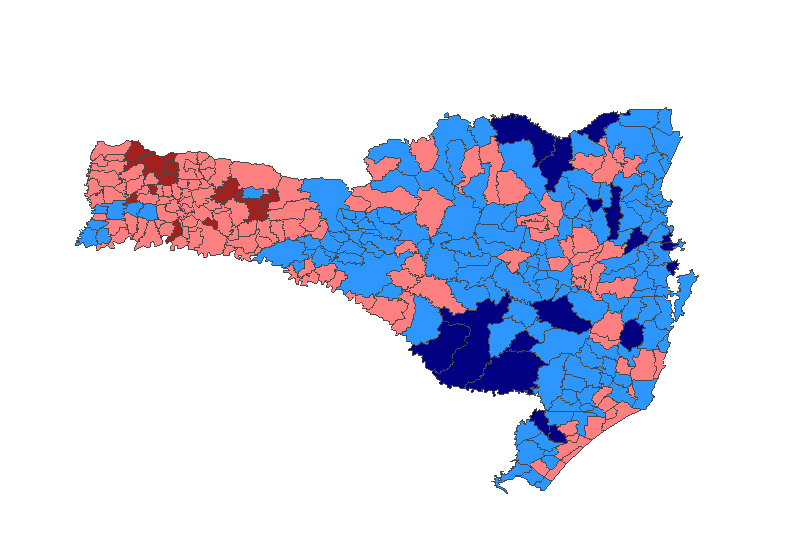
Santa Catarina

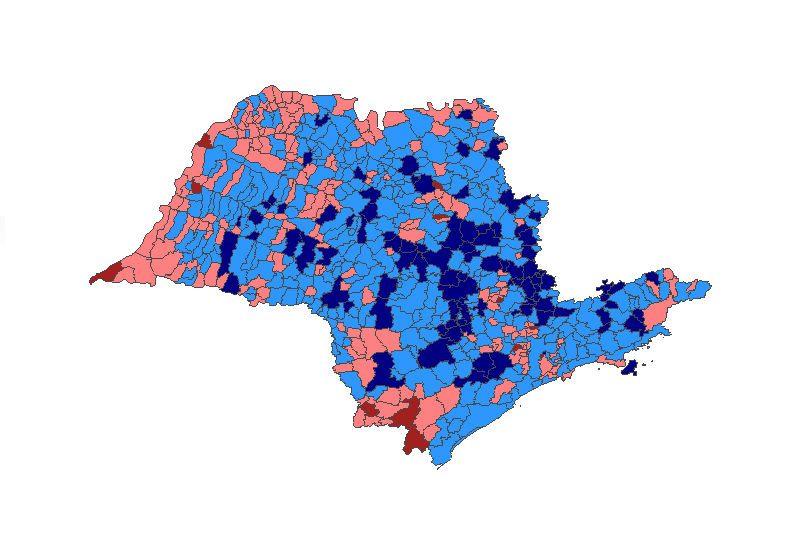
São Paulo

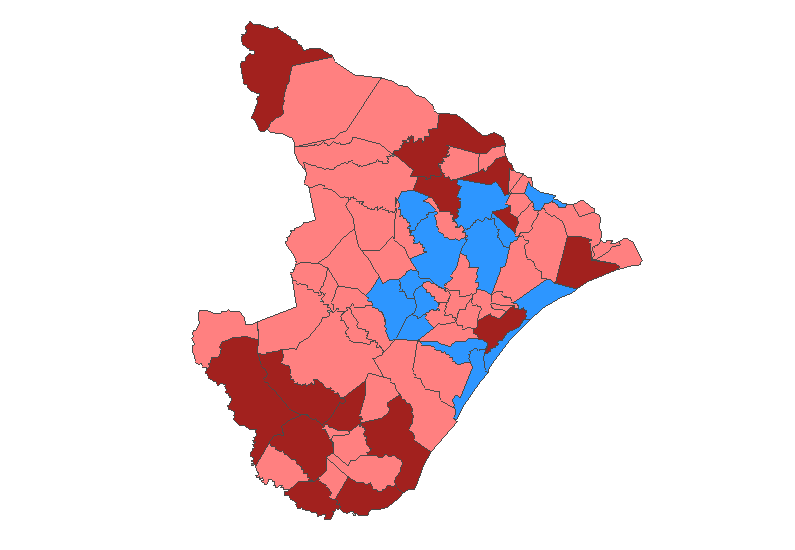
Sergipe

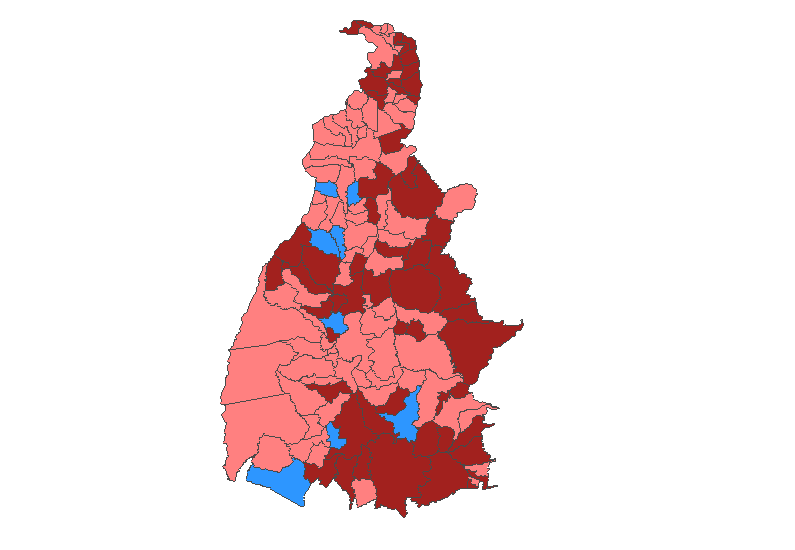
Tocantins

=== Worldwide results ===
Election results following the first round of voting by expatriate voters.

==== First round ====
Countries/territories won by Dilma Rousseff
Countries/territories won by José Serra
Countries/territories won by Marina Silva

Country	Dilma Rousseff	José Serra	Marina Silva	Other candidates	Source
Expatriate voters
Algeria	10	6	3	0	
Angola	78	46	27	2	
Argentina	1,348	590	327	42	
Australia	117	248	145	18	
Austria	147	168	118	15	
Belgium	464	301	290	28	
Bolivia	323	510	116	34	
Canada	1,067	1,829	983	61	
Cape Verde	24	5	10	0	
Chile	345	458	124	23	
China (HK)	17	32	18	4	
China (PRC)	42	116	36	7	
China (ROC)	6	24	0	1	
Colombia	93	133	36	7	
Republic of Congo	6	6	4	0	
Congo-Kinshasa	8	7	4	1	
Costa Rica	88	131	60	8	
Côte d'Ivoire	29	4	3	1	
Cuba	195	11	14	7	
Czech Republic	24	23	13	0	
Denmark	126	68	67	10	
Dominican Republic	49	60	14	1	
East Timor	26	9	40	1	
Ecuador	95	94	22	4	
Egypt	21	10	11	0	
El Salvador	36	21	10	0	
Finland	38	47	36	6	
France (mainland)	964	618	462	41	
France (Guyane)	992	496	294	21	
Gabon	17	2	3	1	
Germany	1,133	1,166	828	111	
Greece	112	69	20	7	
Guatemala	39	45	16	2	
Guinea Bissau	18	7	22	1	
Guyana	9	12	8	2	
Honduras	26	49	13	6	
Hungary	33	23	10	6	
India	6	4	8	0	
Indonesia	1	6	2	0	
Ireland	29	48	25	1	
Israel	17	57	19	2	
Italy	2,804	1,573	1,006	206	
Jamaica	17	3	2	0	
Japan	1,726	3,248	772	204	
Jordan	92	31	10	20	
Kenya	5	4	6	0	
Kuwait	10	9	7	0	
Lebanon	368	171	47	35	
Malaysia	7	16	8	0	
Mexico	147	216	46	6	
Morocco	9	1	4	0	
Mozambique	95	51	55	2	
Netherlands	389	332	282	18	
New Zealand	9	22	14	3	
Nicaragua	56	23	5	5	
Nigeria	7	13	0	0	
Norway	111	58	71	4	
Panama	106	173	34	9	
Paraguay	1,007	1,067	185	30	
Peru	127	193	56	18	
Philippines	19	7	1	0	
Poland	17	16	15	1	
Portugal	4,193	2,153	1,080	92	
Qatar	19	26	16	1	
Romania	5	10	14	0	
Russia	8	11	7	6	
Saudi Arabia	7	16	3	0	
Senegal	16	3	20	2	
Serbia	8	6	3	5	
Singapore	12	105	17	3	
South Africa	78	101	66	9	
South Korea	6	20	2	1	
Spain	972	605	369	56	
Suriname	148	89	37	2	
Sweden	287	189	133	15	
Switzerland	1,496	1,188	940	104	
Syria	37	7	3	5	
Thailand	8	22	9	0	
Tunisia	2	7	8	1	
Turkey	3	10	0	0	
United Arab Emirates	13	19	4	0	
United Kingdom	1,106	1,152	782	70	
United States	6,300	12,820	6,620	620	
Uruguay	409	289	152	30	
Venezuela	149	198	24	2	
West Bank	341	25	13	74	
Total	30,950	33,850	17,208	2,141	

==== Second round ====
Election results following the second round of voting by expatriate voters.

Countries/territories won by Dilma Rousseff
Countries/territories won by José Serra

Country	Dilma Rousseff	%	José Serra	%	Source
Expatriate voters
Algeria	9	50%	9	50%	
Angola	78	53.78%	67	46.21%	
Argentina	1,455	64.1%	815	35.9%	
Australia	163	29.48%	390	70.52%	
Austria	178	43.1%	235	56.9%	
Belgium	518	53.18%	456	46.82%	
Bolivia	305	32.14%	644	67.86%	
Canada	1,230	32.29%	2,579	67.71%	
Cape Verde	33	84.62%	6	15.38%	
Chile	372	39.83%	562	60.17%	
China (HK)	24	32.87%	49	67.13%	
China (PRC)	49	22.28%	215	77.72%	
China (ROC)	8	22.86%	27	77.14%	
Colombia	98	40.66%	143	59.34%	
Republic of Congo	5	45.45%	6	54.55%	
Congo-Kinshasa	7	46.67%	8	53.33%	
Costa Rica	106	37.32%	178	62.68%	
Côte d'Ivoire	30	83.33%	6	16.67%	
Cuba	248	97.64%	6	2.36%	
Czech Republic	22	43.14%	29	56.86%	
Denmark	149	56.87%	113	43.13%	
Dominican Republic	65	47.45%	72	52.55%	
East Timor	44	67.69%	21	32.31%	
Ecuador	81	45.51%	97	54.49%	
Egypt	27	65.85%	14	34.15%	
El Salvador	38	52.05%	35	47.95%	
Finland	53	46.49%	61	53.51%	
France (mainland)	1,037	57.32%	772	42.68%	
France (Guyane)	986	59.72%	665	40.28%	
Gabon	19	90.48%	2	9.52%	
Germany	1,287	44.67%	1,594	55.33%	
Greece	93	51.96%	86	48.04%	
Guatemala	30	47.45%	61	52.55%	
Guinea Bissau	25	50%	25	50%	
Guyana	11	40.74%	16	59.26%	
Honduras	22	28.57%	55	71.43%	
Hungary	26	46.43%	30	53.57%	
India	6	46.15%	7	53.85%	
Indonesia	0	0%	8	100%	
Ireland	37	35.92%	66	64.08%	
Israel	19	35.92%	85	64.08%	
Italy	2,732	54.91%	2,243	45.09%	
Jamaica	19	82.61%	4	17.39%	
Japan	1,618	26.47%	4,495	73.53%	
Jordan	100	71.43%	40	28.57%	
Kenya	6	37.5%	10	62.5%	
Kuwait	10	47.62%	11	52.38%	
Lebanon	394	65.78%	205	34.22%	
Malaysia	12	37.5%	20	62.5%	
Mexico	129	35.73%	232	64.27%	
Morocco	9	64.29%	5	35.71%	
Mozambique	107	57.53%	79	42.47%	
Netherlands	483	49.14%	500	50.86%	
New Zealand	14	31.11%	31	68.89%	
Nicaragua	50	58.82%	35	41.18%	
Nigeria	13	40.63%	19	59.38%	
Norway	146	60.08%	97	39.92%	
Panama	110	37.67%	182	62.33%	
Paraguay	914	39.13%	1,344	60.87%	
Peru	128	39.13%	250	60.87%	
Philippines	18	78.26%	5	21.74%	
Poland	18	39.13%	28	60.87%	
Portugal	4,382	57.92%	3,183	42.08%	
Qatar	18	33.96%	35	66.04%	
Romania	3	11.54%	23	88.46%	
Russia	12	34.29%	23	65.71%	
Saudi Arabia	7	30.43%	16	69.57%	
Senegal	15	38.46%	24	61.54%	
Serbia	13	52%	12	48%	
Singapore	17	11.33%	133	88.67%	
South Africa	58	32.17%	107	67.83%	
South Korea	6	18.75%	26	81.25%	
Spain	1,024	55.32%	827	44.68%	
Suriname	120	53.1%	106	46.9%	
Sweden	315	54.88%	259	45.12%	
Switzerland	1,734	47.78%	1,895	52.22%	
Syria	37	67.27%	18	32.73%	
Thailand	10	24.39%	37	75.61%	
Tunisia	7	58.33%	5	41.67%	
Turkey	4	36.36%	7	63.64%	
United Arab Emirates	16	45.71%	19	54.29%	
United Kingdom	1,299	42.15%	1,783	57.85%	
United States	7,003	27.51%	18,457	72.49%	
Uruguay	413	51.5%	389	48.5%	
Venezuela	205	40.2%	305	59.8%	
West Bank	355	91.97%	31	8.03%	
Total	33,112	40.86%	47,913	59.13%	

=== Voter demographics ===
Demographic subgroup	Rousseff	Serra	% of total vote
Total vote	56	44	100
Gender
Men	60	40	48
Women	53	47	52
Age
16–24 years old	54	46	18
25–34 years old	57	43	24
35–44 years old	59	41	20
45–59 years old	58	42	23
60 and older	53	47	15
Education
Less than high school	62	38	45
High school diploma	54	46	39
Bachelor's degree or more	45	55	16
Family income
Under 2x min wage	62	38	44
2-5x min wage	55	45	36
5-10x min wage	50	50	11
Over 10x min wage	43	57	9
Region
Southeast	53	47	45
South	47	53	16
Northeast	69	31	25
North + Central-West	55	45	14

== Chamber of Deputies ==
Party	Votes	%	Seats	+/–
Workers' Party	16,289,199	16.87	88	+5
Brazilian Democratic Movement Party	12,537,252	12.98	78	–11
Brazilian Social Democracy Party	11,477,380	11.88	54	–11
Party of the Republic	7,311,655	7.57	42	+18
Democrats	7,301,171	7.56	43	–22
Brazilian Socialist Party	6,851,053	7.09	34	+7
Progressive Party	6,330,062	6.55	41	–1
Democratic Labour Party	4,854,602	5.03	28	+4
Brazilian Labour Party	4,038,239	4.18	21	–1
Green Party	3,710,366	3.84	15	+2
Social Christian Party	3,072,546	3.18	17	+8
Communist Party of Brazil	2,748,290	2.85	15	+2
Popular Socialist Party	2,536,809	2.63	12	–9
Brazilian Republican Party	1,633,500	1.69	7	+6
Socialism and Liberty Party	1,142,737	1.18	3	0
Party of National Mobilization	1,086,705	1.13	4	+1
Humanist Party of Solidarity	764,412	0.79	2	0
Labour Party of Brazil	642,422	0.67	3	+2
Christian Labour Party	595,431	0.62	1	–3
Social Liberal Party	499,963	0.52	1	+1
Brazilian Labour Renewal Party	307,925	0.32	2	+2
Progressive Republican Party	307,188	0.32	2	+2
Christian Social Democratic Party	191,835	0.20	0	0
National Labour Party	182,926	0.19	0	0
United Socialist Workers' Party	102,120	0.11	0	0
Brazilian Communist Party	57,563	0.06	0	0
Workers' Cause Party	6,660	0.01	0	0
Total	96,580,011	100.00	513	0
Valid votes	96,580,011	86.98		
Invalid/blank votes	14,458,672	13.02		
Total votes	111,038,683	100.00		
Registered voters/turnout	135,523,622	81.93		
Source: Election Resources

== Senate ==
Party	Votes	%	Seats		
Party	Votes	%	Won	Total	+/–
Workers' Party	39,410,141	23.12	11	15	+5
Brazilian Social Democracy Party	30,903,736	18.13	5	11	–3
Brazilian Democratic Movement Party	23,998,949	14.08	16	19	+3
Communist Party of Brazil	12,561,716	7.37	1	2	0
Democrats	10,225,883	6.00	2	6	–12
Progressive Party	9,170,015	5.38	4	5	+4
Brazilian Labour Party	7,999,589	4.69	1	6	+2
Popular Socialist Party	6,766,517	3.97	1	1	0
Brazilian Socialist Party	6,129,463	3.60	3	3	0
Green Party	5,047,797	2.96	0	0	0
Party of the Republic	4,649,024	2.73	3	4	+1
Brazilian Republican Party	3,332,886	1.96	1	1	–1
Socialism and Liberty Party	3,041,854	1.78	2	2	+1
Democratic Labour Party	2,431,940	1.43	2	4	–1
Labour Party of Brazil	1,480,846	0.87	0	0	0
Social Christian Party	1,247,157	0.73	1	1	+1
Social Liberal Party	446,517	0.26	0	0	0
United Socialist Workers' Party	436,192	0.26	0	0	0
Humanist Party of Solidarity	305,793	0.18	0	0	0
Christian Labour Party	282,629	0.17	0	0	0
Party of National Mobilization	241,321	0.14	1	1	+1
Brazilian Communist Party	146,627	0.09	0	0	0
Brazilian Labour Renewal Party	74,478	0.04	0	0	–1
Christian Social Democratic Party	73,227	0.04	0	0	0
Workers' Cause Party	21,263	0.01	0	0	0
National Labour Party	6,013	0.00	0	0	0
Total	170,431,573	100.00	54	81	18
Total votes	111,038,684	–			
Registered voters/turnout	135,523,622	81.93			
Source: Election Results
