= Rádio Santos =

- Type: Radio network
- Country: Brazil
- Availability: National, through regional affiliates
- Owner: Santos FC
- Launch date: 2010
- Official website: Official Site

Rádio Santos is a Paulista radio network operated by Santos FC on its official website. Match commentaries is available on Rádio Santos for all first team games, including friendlies. In order to gain as wide an audience as possible, broadcasts are in two languages: Portuguese and English.
