= Cidade Nova Station =

Metro station in Rio de Janeiro, Brazil

Cidade Nova
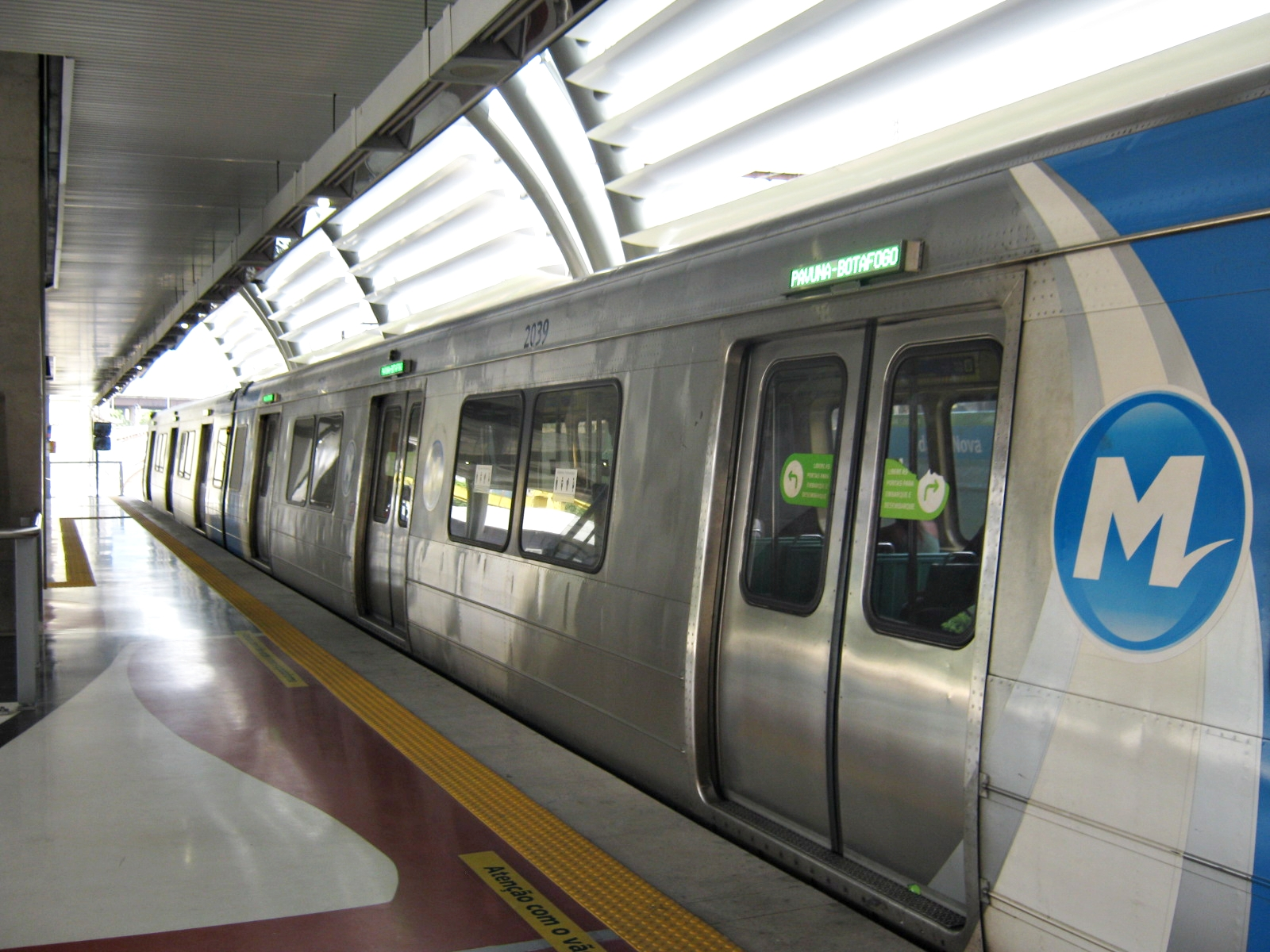
- Train at Cidade Nova station

General information
- Location: Rio de Janeiro; Brazil
- Coordinates: 22.9090384°S 43.2135099°W
- Operator: Metrô Rio
- Line: Line 2

Construction
- Accessible: yes

Other information
- Station code: CNV

History
- Opened: 2010; 16 years ago

Services
Preceding station	Rio de Janeiro Metro	Following station
São Cristóvão towards Pavuna	Line 2	Central do Brasil towards Botafogo
Location
- Location within Rio de Janeiro

Cidade Nova Station (Portuguese: Estação Cidade Nova) is a subway station on the Rio de Janeiro Metro that serves the neighbourhood of Cidade Nova in the North Zone of Rio de Janeiro. The station was opened in 2010.
