= Revista Santástico =

Brazilian sports magazine dedicated to Santos FC

- Categories: Football
- Frequency: Bimonthly; Monthly
- Founded: 2010; 16 years ago
- Country: Brazil
- Based in: Santos
- Language: Portuguese
- Website: Official Site

Revista Santástico is a Brazilian sports magazine entirely dedicated to the football club Santos FC. As of 2014 it appeared bimonthly. It is released on a monthly basis. Issues are published every four weeks for the Santos club members and the Peixe's Fan Club Card Holders.

Contributors to the magazine include specialised journalists from other media, who both write monthly columns. Also included in the magazine are reports on the club's matches in the previous month, as well as information about the reserve and youth teams. Features often include interviews with players, both past and present, or examinations of the club's history.
