= Cinthia Régia Gomes do Livramento =

Brazilian politician

Personal details
- Born: 1964 Manaus, Brazil
- Died: 13 May 2010 (aged 45–46) Manaus, Brazil

Cinthia Régia Gomes do Livramento (1964 – 13 May 2010) was a Brazilian politician. She served as the Education Secretary of the Brazilian state of Amazonas until her death in 2010.

Cinthia Régia Gomes do Livramento was killed in a small plane crash in Manaus, Brazil, on May 13, 2010, at the age of 46. Her plane, which was scheduled to travel from Manaus to the town of Maués, crashed shortly after take-off from Eduardo Gomes International Airport for unknown reasons, killing Livramento, the pilot and four of her aides. Amazonas Vice Governor Omar José Abdel Aziz declared three days of mourning following the accident.
