= Alheira e Igreja Nova =

- Civil parish
- Location in Portugal
- Coordinates: 41.613°N 8.563°W
- Country: Portugal
- Region: Norte
- Intermunic. comm.: Cávado
- District: Braga
- Municipality: Barcelos

Area
  - Total: 10.17 km^{2} (3.93 sq mi)

Population (2011)
  - Total: 1,456
  - Density: 143.2/km^{2} (370.8/sq mi)
- Time zone: UTC+00:00 (WET)
  - Summer (DST): UTC+01:00 (WEST)

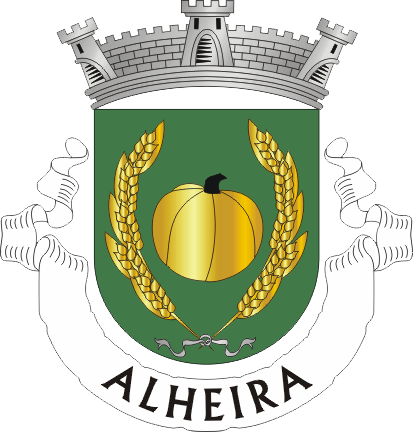
Crest of Alheira

Alheira e Igreja Nova is a civil parish in the municipality of Barcelos, Portugal. It was formed in 2013 by the merger of the former parishes Alheira and Igreja Nova. The population in 2011 was 1,456, in an area of 10.17 km^{2}.
