= Busão do Brasil =

2010 Brazilian reality television series

- Created by: Endemol
- Starring: Edgard Piccoli
- Opening theme: "Busão do Brasil" by Claudia Leitte
- Country of origin: Brazil
- No. of episodes: 82

Production
- Running time: 60 minutes (Live Shows)

Original release
- Network: Band
- Release: July 30 – October 19, 2010

Busão do Brasil was a Brazilian reality television show, which premiered July 30, 2010 with the season finale airing October 19, 2010 on the Band television network.

The show was presented by former MTV Brasil VJ Edgard Piccoli, with the direction of Michael Ukstin. There were twelve contestants competing for the grand prize, which was R$1,000,000 without tax allowances.

Twenty-nine-year-old police officer Mario Remo won the competition over student Thalita Wagner and fashion designer Camilla Fit at the live finale.

== Production ==
=== Cast ===
Casting and production started in March 2010. Applications were due by May 3, 2010, until June 3, 2010. Ultimately, twelve contestants were chosen by the producers to participate the show between July and October 2010.

=== The bus ===
During three months, the bus traveled for 11 different Brazilian states, covering about 4,000 miles and stopping in 14 cities.

== Format ==
Busão do Brasil is a reality television show created by Endemol, in which a group of people live together in a large and luxury bus, isolated from the outside world but continuously watched by television cameras.

The series lasted for around three months, where the contestants tried to win a cash prize by avoiding periodic evictions from the bus.

=== Voting format ===
Each week the public makes the nominations. On Friday night, the lines are temporarily frozen and the three highest rated contestants are revealed to the public, while only clues to the nominated candidates are given to contestants. Then, the lines are re-opened until Tuesday night, where the three contestants who received the most votes throughout the week face the elimination.

== Contestants ==
On Day 1, twenty-four hopefuls arrived at the entrance of the bus. Only eleven contestants were selected to enter out of all candidates. The twelfth contestant was selected by a special vote, in which the eleven contestants vote for one of the thirteen that were not originally chosen. A new contestant, Teca, entered the bus on Day 47.

(ages stated at time of contest)

Name	Age	Occupation	Hometown	Status	Finish
Tato Tarcan	26	Blogger	São Bernardo	Evicted: Day 08	13th
Ammie Graves	22	DJ	São José	Evicted: Day 15	12th
Julio Hasse	25	Rapper	Blumenau	Evicted: Day 26	11th
Dede Lipparelli	28	Promoter	São Paulo	Evicted: Day 33	10th
Deya Souza	25	Secretaire	São Paulo	Evicted: Day 40	9th
Leo Tanus	33	Model	São Paulo	Evicted: Day 47	8th
Joice Veronica	22	Funk Singer	Rio de Janeiro	Evicted: Day 54	7th
Julio Bueno	28	Gogo-Boy	Santos	Evicted: Day 61	6th
Cadu Martins	23	ONG Director	Curitiba	Evicted: Day 68	5th
Teca Mesquita	22	Student	Nova Friburgo	Evicted: Day 75	4th
Camilla Fit	26	Fashion Designer	Belo Horizonte	Finalist: Day 82	3rd
Thalita Wagner	22	Student	Santos	Finalist: Day 82	Runner-Up
Mario Remo	29	Police Officer	Teresina	Finalist: Day 82	Winner

== Summaries ==
=== The Bus tour ===
	First air date	Destination
Launch	July 30, 2010	Fortaleza, Ceará (Starting Line)
Launch	Aug 03, 2010	Mossoró, Rio Grande do Norte
1	Aug 06, 2010	Mossoró, Rio Grande do Norte
1	Aug 10, 2010	Campina Grande, Paraíba
2	Aug 13, 2010	Caruaru, Pernambuco
2	Aug 17, 2010	Barra de St. Antônio, Alagoas
3	Aug 20, 2010	Barra de St. Antônio, Alagoas
3	Aug 24, 2010	Canindé, Sergipe
4	Aug 27, 2010	Feira de Santana, Bahia
4	Aug 31, 2010	Feira de Santana, Bahia
5	Sep 03, 2010	Feira de Santana, Bahia
5	Sep 07, 2010	Lençóis, Bahia
6	Sep 10, 2010	Lençóis, Bahia
6	Sep 14, 2010	Ilhéus, Bahia
7	Sep 17, 2010	Ilhéus, Bahia
7	Sep 21, 2010	Itamaraju, Bahia
8	Sep 24, 2010	Itamaraju, Bahia
8	Sep 28, 2010	Domingos Martins, Espírito Santo
9	Oct 01, 2010	Domingos Martins, Espírito Santo
9	Oct 05, 2010	Mariana, Minas Gerais
10	Oct 08, 2010	Mariana, Minas Gerais
10	Oct 12, 2010	Petrópolis, Rio de Janeiro
11; Finale	Oct 15, 2010	Petrópolis, Rio de Janeiro
11; Finale	Oct 19, 2010	São Paulo, São Paulo (state) (Finish Line)

=== Voting history ===
	Week 1	Week 2	Week 3	Week 4	Week 5	Week 6	Week 7	Week 8	Week 9	Week 10	Week 11	Elimination Votes
	Week 1	Week 2	Week 3	Week 4	Week 5	Week 6	Week 7	Week 8	Week 9	Week 10	Finale	Elimination Votes
Nominations (Lines Frozen)	(none)		Dedé; Hasse; Julio	Camilla; Dedé; Deya	Cadu; Joice; Thalita	Cadu; Joice; Leo	Cadu; Camilla; Teca	Camilla; Mario; Teca	Cadu; Camilla; Mario	(none)	(none)	
Fan Favorite	Dedé	Leo	Leo	Thalita	Leo	Thalita	Mario	Mario	Teca	Thalita	(none)	
Nominations (Lines Closed)	Cadu; Joice; Tato	Ammie; Julio; Joice	Dedé; Hasse; Julio	Dedé; Deya; Julio	Cadu; Deya; Joice	Cadu; Joice; Leo	Cadu; Camilla; Joice	Cadu; Julio; Teca	Cadu; Mario; Thalita	Camilla; Mario; Teca	(none)	
Mario	Tato	Ammie	Hasse	Dedé	Deya	Leo	Joice	Julio	Cadu	Teca	Winner (Day 82)	1
Thalita	Tato	Julio	Dedé	Dedé	Deya	Leo	Joice	Julio	Cadu	Teca	Runner-Up (Day 82)	1
Camilla	Tato	Julio	Dedé	Dedé	Deya	Leo	Joice	Julio	Cadu	Teca	3rd Place (Day 82)	3
Teca	Not in the Bus					Cadu	Camilla	Cadu	Mario	Camilla	Evicted (Day 75)	5
Cadu	Joice	Ammie	Hasse	Dedé	Deya	Joice	Joice	Teca	Thalita	Evicted (Day 68)		9
Julio	Cadu	Ammie	Hasse	Dedé	Joice	Joice	Camilla	Teca	Evicted (Day 61)			8
Joice	Tato	Ammie	Hasse	Deya	Cadu	Cadu	Cadu	Evicted (Day 54)				13
Leo	Tato	Ammie	Hasse	Deya	Joice	Cadu	Evicted (Day 47)					4
Deya	Joice	Ammie	Hasse	Dedé	Cadu	Evicted (Day 40)						6
Dedé	Tato	Ammie	Hasse	Julio	Evicted (Day 33)							9
Hasse	Joice	Julio	Dedé	Evicted (Day 26)								7
Ammie	Joice	Julio	Evicted (Day 15)									7
Tato	Joice	Evicted (Day 8)										6
Notes	(none)		1	2	3	4	5	6	7	(none)	8	
Evicted	Tato; 6 of 12 votes to evict	Ammie; 7 of 11 votes to evict	Hasse; 7 of 10 votes to evict	Dedé; 6 of 9 votes to evict	Deya; 4 of 8 votes to evict	Leo; 4 of 9 votes to evict	Joice; 4 of 7 votes to evict	Julio; 3 of 6 votes to evict	Cadu; 3 of 5 votes to evict	Teca; 3 of 4 votes to evict	Camilla; 8.5% to win	
Evicted	Tato; 6 of 12 votes to evict	Ammie; 7 of 11 votes to evict	Hasse; 7 of 10 votes to evict	Dedé; 6 of 9 votes to evict	Deya; 4 of 8 votes to evict	Leo; 4 of 9 votes to evict	Joice; 4 of 7 votes to evict	Julio; 3 of 6 votes to evict	Cadu; 3 of 5 votes to evict	Teca; 3 of 4 votes to evict	Thalita; 11.3% to win	
Evicted	Tato; 6 of 12 votes to evict	Ammie; 7 of 11 votes to evict	Hasse; 7 of 10 votes to evict	Dedé; 6 of 9 votes to evict	Deya; 4 of 8 votes to evict	Leo; 4 of 9 votes to evict	Joice; 4 of 7 votes to evict	Julio; 3 of 6 votes to evict	Cadu; 3 of 5 votes to evict	Teca; 3 of 4 votes to evict	Mario; 80.2% to win	

=== Notes ===
- Note 1: At the Eviction Night on Friday, it was revealed that Dedé, Hasse and Julio were nominated for eviction. However, it was also revealed that the eviction would be pospotoned to Tuesday, where all the evictions would occur from that point. On Friday, partial results will be revealed to the public. Despite the changes, nominations for week three remained intact.
- Note 2: At the Partial Results on Friday, it was revealed to the public that Camilla, Dedé and Deya were nominated for eviction. However, the results changed and Julio ended up replacing Camilla at the Eviction Night on Tuesday.
- Note 3: At the Partial Results on Friday, it was revealed to the public that Cadu, Joice and Thalita were nominated for eviction. However, the results changed and Deya ended up replacing Thalita at the Eviction Night on Tuesday.
- Note 4: At the Partial Results on Friday, it was revealed to the public that Cadu, Joice and Leo were nominated for eviction. At the Eviction Night on Tuesday, Leo and Cadu tied with 3 votes each. Thalita, as Fan Favorite, had the casting vote and chose to evict Leo.
- Note 5: At the Partial Results on Friday, it was revealed to the public that Cadu, Camilla and Teca were nominated for eviction. However, the results changed and Joice ended up replacing Teca at the Eviction Night on Tuesday.
- Note 6: At the Partial Results on Friday, it was revealed to the public that Camilla, Mario and Teca were nominated for eviction. However, the results changed and Cadu and Julio ended up replacing Camilla and Mario at the Eviction Night on Tuesday.
- Note 7: At the Partial Results on Friday, it was revealed to the public that Cadu, Camilla and Mario were nominated for eviction. However, the results changed and Thalita ended up replacing Camilla at the Eviction Night on Tuesday.
- Note 8: For the Final, the public voted for the contestant they want to win.
