= Viana Júnior =

Brazilian comedian and actor

Sérgio von Puttkammer, best known by the stage name Viana Júnior (1941 or 1942 – June 7, 2010), was a Brazilian comedian and actor.

The comedian is best remembered for the character Apolônio, who acted with A Velha Surda (The Old Deaf Woman, in Portuguese) character on A Praça É Nossa, a SBT TV show.

Viana Júnior died on June 7, 2010, at his home in Itanhaém, São Paulo. The cause of death was multiple organ failure.
