= List of 2010 box office number-one films in Brazil =

This is a list of films which have placed number one at the weekend box office in Brazil during 2010 (Amounts are in Brazilian reais; 1 real is approximately equivalent to 0.64 US dollars).

== Number-one films ==
†	This implies the highest-grossing movie of the year.

Date	Film	Gross	Notes
3 January	Avatar	R$6,503,268	Most weeks at number one in 2010.
10 January	Alvin and the Chipmunks: The Squeakquel	R$5,926,489	
17 January	Avatar	R$4,841,019	
24 January	Avatar	R$4,391,362	
31 January	Avatar	R$3,870,667	
7 February	Avatar	R$2,700,815	
14 February	Percy Jackson & the Olympians: The Lightning Thief	R$2,461,100	
21 February	Avatar	R$2,277,020	
28 February	Percy Jackson & the Olympians: The Lightning Thief	R$1,741,684	
7 March	Avatar	R$1,691,904	
14 March	Shutter Island	R$2,008,071	
21 March	The Book of Eli	R$1,942,202	
28 March	How to Train your Dragon	R$4,456,129	
4 April	Chico Xavier	R$6,154,017	Brazilian film
11 April	Chico Xavier	R$4,510,506	
18 April	Chico Xavier	R$3,146,228	
25 April	Alice in Wonderland	R$10,620,651	
2 May	Iron Man 2	R$8,529,311	
9 May	Alice in Wonderland	R$5,804,311	
16 May	Alice in Wonderland	R$4,745,330	
23 May	Clash of the Titans	R$7,462,813	
30 May	Clash of the Titans	R$5,03,986	
6 June	Prince of Persia: The Sands of Time	R$4,084,795	
13 June	Prince of Persia: The Sands of Time	R$2,858,391	
20 June	Toy Story 3	R$4.692.136	
27 June	Toy Story 3	R$6.149.734	
4 July	The Twilight Saga: Eclipse	R$11.824.498	
11 July	Shrek Forever After	R$11.261.207	
18 July	Shrek Forever After	R$10.603.073	
25 July	Shrek Forever After	R$8.044.733	
1 August	Shrek Forever After	R$5.995.478	
8 August	Despicable Me	R$5.220.730	
15 August	Despicable Me	R$4.643.141	
22 August	The Last Airbender	R$4.463.523	
29 August	The Karate Kid	R$3.642.374	
5 September	Nosso Lar	R$5.749.371	Brazilian film
12 September	Nosso Lar	R$4.580.149	Brazilian film
19 September	Resident Evil: Afterlife	R$5.092.093	
26 September	Resident Evil: Afterlife	R$3.035.934	
3 October	Eat Pray Love	R$3.513.946	
10 October	Tropa de Elite 2 †	R$14.033.577	Brazilian film; highest opening weekend of the year, and highest in 20 years; highest-grossing film and attendance ever in Brazil
17 October	Tropa de Elite 2 †	R$12.245.246	Brazilian film; highest opening weekend of the year, and highest in 20 years; highest-grossing film and attendance ever in Brazil
24 October	Tropa de Elite 2 †	R$9.074.816	Brazilian film; highest opening weekend of the year, and highest in 20 years; highest-grossing film and attendance ever in Brazil
31 October	Tropa de Elite 2 †	R$7.547.285	Brazilian film; highest opening weekend of the year, and highest in 20 years; highest-grossing film and attendance ever in Brazil
7 November	Tropa de Elite 2 †	R$4.714.704	Brazilian film; highest opening weekend of the year, and highest in 20 years; highest-grossing film and attendance ever in Brazil
14 November	Tropa de Elite 2 †	R$3.974.874	Brazilian film; highest opening weekend of the year, and highest in 20 years; highest-grossing film and attendance ever in Brazil
21 November	Harry Potter and the Deathly Hallows – Part 1	R$12.020.492	Highest opening weekend for a foreign movie of the year
28 November	Harry Potter and the Deathly Hallows – Part 1	R$5.874.394	Highest opening weekend for a foreign movie of the year
5 December	Megamind	R$3.912.189	
12 December	The Chronicles of Narnia: The Voyage of the Dawn Treader	R$4.484.102	
19 December	Tron: Legacy	R$3.086.462	
26 December	Tron: Legacy	R$1.685.612	

== See also ==
- List of Brazilian films
