= Santos TV =

Ownership
- Owner: Santos FC

History
- Launched: 2010

Santos TV is a Brazilian subscription based television channel, operated by Santos FC. The channel first broadcast 2010.

Santos TV offers Peixe fans exclusive interviews with players and staff, full matches, including all Campeonato Paulista and Campeonato Brasileiro Série A games (broadcast generally at midnight of the day the match was played), live reserve and academy games and "classic" matches plus footballing news and other themed programming. The station also broadcasts all of the team's pre-season friendly matches.

The channel is available in Portuguese and English. Programs from Santos TV are also shown on Justin.tv in the United States of America, the United Kingdom and Australia.
