= District deputy =

A district deputy is an elected representative of the Legislative Chamber of the Federal District in Brazil.

The form of election, term of office and the calculation of the number of district deputies are the same, according to the 1988 Constitution of Brazil, as for state deputies. Currently, the Legislative Chamber of the Federal District has 24 district deputies elected by direct vote.

The first district deputies were elected in 1990.

The district deputies accumulate the legislative powers of both the states (state deputies) and the municipalities (councilors), as determined by the 1988 constitution, thus having a hybrid character.

== Duties ==
District deputies can suggest creating, altering, or eliminating a law. They also vote for or against the proposals of the other district deputies.

The governor of the Federal District is responsible for spending the taxpayer's tax revenue on health, education, culture, security, infrastructure, etc. The district deputy has the duty to oversee the destination of the collected resources.

District deputies can participate in decisions on government spending.

== Analogues in Brazilian politics ==
The analogue in a Brazilian state is a state deputy in the state's Legislative Assembly.

The analogue at the federal level is a federal deputy in the Chamber of Deputies.
