= Igreja Nova, Alagoas =

Municipality in Alagoas, Brazil

Igreja Nova
- Municipality of Alagoas, Brazil
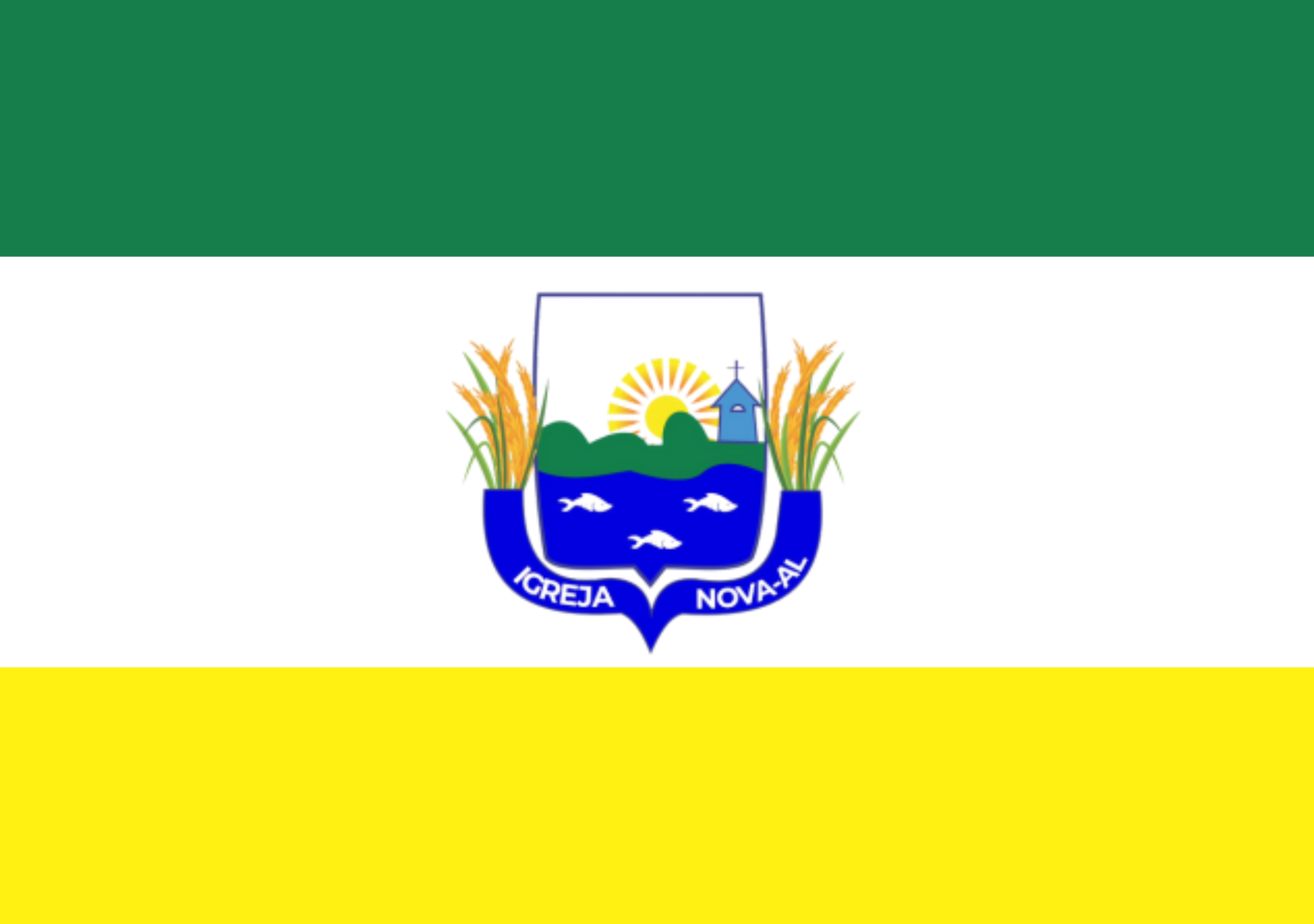
- Flag

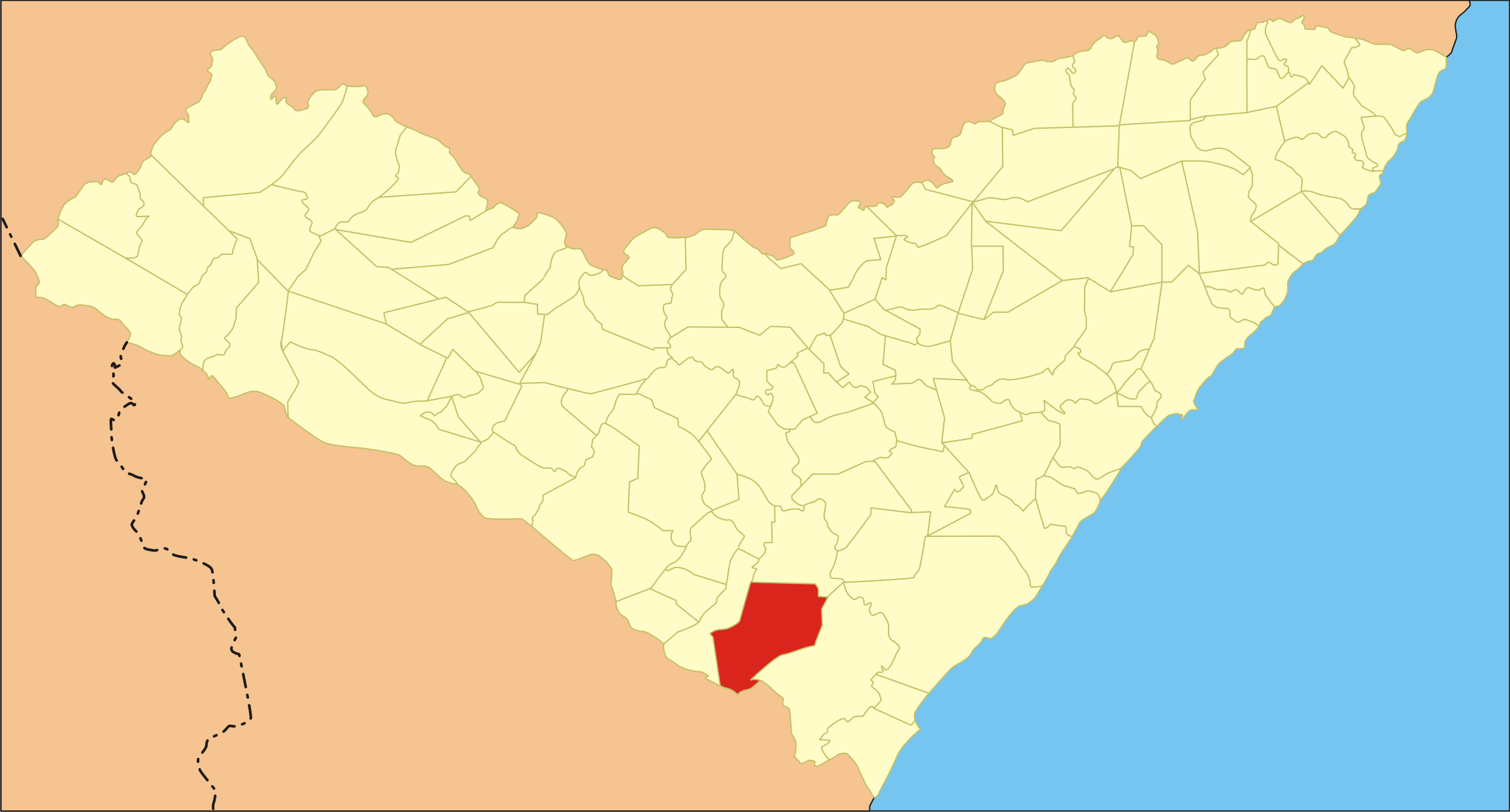
- Location of Igreja Nova in Alagoas

- Location within Brazil Location within South America
- Coordinates: 10°7′31″S 36°39′43″W
- Country: Brazil
- Region: Northeast
- State: Alagoas
- Founded: 28 May 1897

Government
  - Mayor: Tiago Gomes dos Santos (MDB) (2025-2028)
  - Vice Mayor: Edvaldo Cavalcante (MDB) (2025-2028)

Area
  - Total: 426.538 km^{2} (164.687 sq mi)
- Elevation: 20 m (66 ft)

Population (2022)
  - Total: 21,372
  - Density: 50.11/km^{2} (129.8/sq mi)
- Demonym: Igreja-novense (Brazilian Portuguese)
- Time zone: UTC-03:00 (Brasília Time)
- Postal code: 57280-000
- HDI (2010): 0.568 – medium
- Website: igrejanova.al.gov.br

Igreja Nova (Central northeastern portuguese pronunciation: [iˈɡɾeʒɐ ˈnɔvɐ]) is a municipality located in the south of the Brazilian state of Alagoas. Its population is 24,586 (2020) and its area is 429 km^{2}.

== See also ==
- List of municipalities in Alagoas
