= North Korea national football team =

DPR Korea
- Nickname(s): 천리마, Cheollima (Chollima) 동아시아의 삼바, Dong Asia-ui samba (Samba of East Asia)
- Association: DPR Korea Football Association (PRKFA)
- Confederation: AFC (Asia)
- Sub-confederation: EAFF (East Asia)
- Head coach: Sin Yong-nam
- Captain: Jang Kuk-chol
- Most caps: Ri Myong-guk (118)
- Top scorer: Jong Il-gwan (31)
- Home stadium: Kim Il Sung Stadium
- FIFA code: PRK
First colours	Second colours

FIFA ranking
- Current: 121 ▼1 (7 October 2026)
- Highest: 57 (November 1993)
- Lowest: 181 (October – November 1998)

First international
- China 0–1 North Korea (Beijing, China; 7 October 1956)

Biggest win
- North Korea 21–0 Guam (Taipei, Taiwan; 11 March 2005)

Biggest defeat
- Portugal 7–0 North Korea (Cape Town, South Africa; 21 June 2010)

World Cup
- Appearances: 2 (first in 1966)
- Best result: Quarter-finals (1966)

AFC Asian Cup
- Appearances: 6 (first in 1980)
- Best result: Fourth place (1980)

AFC Challenge Cup
- Appearances: 3 (first in 2008)
- Best result: Champions (2010, 2012)

EAFF E-1 Football Championship
- Appearances: 4 (first in 2005)
- Best result: Third place (2005, 2015)
Medal record
Asian Games
Gold medal – first place	1978 Thailand	Team
Silver medal – second place	1990 China	Team
AFC Challenge Cup
Gold medal – first place	2012 Nepal	Team
Gold medal – first place	2010 Sri Lanka	Team
Bronze medal – third place	2008 India	Team
EAFF E-1 Football Championship
Bronze medal – third place	2005 South Korea	Team
Bronze medal – third place	2015 China	Team

- DPR of Korea national football team
- Chosŏn'gŭl: 조선민주주의인민공화국 축구 국가대표팀
- Hancha: 朝鮮民主主義人民共和國蹴球國家代表팀
- Revised Romanization: Joseon Minjujuui Inmin Gonghwaguk Chukgu Gukga Daepyo Tim
- McCune–Reischauer: Chosŏn Minjujuŭi Inmin Konghwaguk Ch'ukku Kukka Taep'yo T'im

Munhwaŏ
- Chosŏn'gŭl: 조선민주주의인민공화국 국가종합팀
- Hancha: 朝鮮民主主義人民共和國國家綜合팀
- Revised Romanization: Joseon Minjujuui Inmin Gonghwaguk Gukga Jonghap Tim
- McCune–Reischauer: Chosŏn Minjujuŭi Inmin Konghwaguk Kukka Chonghap T'im

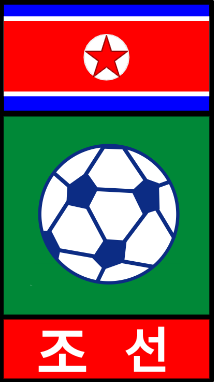

The North Korea national football team (Munhwaeo Korean: 조선민주주의인민공화국 국가종합팀; North Korean romanisation: Josŏn minjujuŭi inmin konghwaguk kukka chonghap thim; recognized as Korea DPR by FIFA) represents North Korea in men's international football and it is controlled by the DPR Korea Football Association, the governing body for football in North Korea. It has been a member of FIFA since 1958 and a member of AFC since 1974.

North Korea's national team made its FIFA World Cup debut in 1966, reaching the quarter-finals and defeating Italy in the group stage, becoming the first Asian team to advance beyond the group stage. During the 2006 FIFA World Cup qualifiers, controversy arose when the team's supporters rioted over the team's failure to qualify, interfering with the opposing team’s exit from the stadium. In 2009, the team secured qualification for the 2010 FIFA World Cup, marking its second World Cup appearance in their history. North Korea has qualified for the AFC Asian Cup six times; finishing fourth in 1980, and appearing in 1992, 2011, in 2015, and in 2019. The current squad includes both native North Koreans and Japanese Zainichi Koreans.

== History ==
=== North Korea's debut and the 1966 FIFA World Cup ===
The North Korea Football Association was founded in 1945. It became a member of the AFC during the confederation's first year of existence in 1954, and has been affiliated with FIFA since 1958. The first official match of the North Korean national football team was played on 22 March 1964, in Rangoon, against Burma, as part of the 1964 Olympic qualifiers. This first match in the history of the North Korean selection ended in a goalless draw. Thanks to their victory over the Burmese in the second leg, the Chollimas reached the next round against Thailand, a two-legged affair also hosted in Rangoon. They won easily (7–0 over the two matches), but were forced to forfeit the final phase of the tournament because the IOC decided to ban any athlete who participated in the GANEFO—which several footballers from the national team did.

In 1965, the national team took part again in GANEFO, and in 1966 FIFA World Cup qualification for the first time. That year, FIFA decided to place all the selections entered from Africa, Asia and Oceania in a single qualifying group, with the aim of offering only one place. All registered African countries protested by withdrawing from the competition, leaving only North Korea and Australia. The Australians started as favourites, but the North Koreans won both matches (6–1 and 3–1) and qualified for the final phase. The qualification of North Korea posed a diplomatic problem for the organizing country, the United Kingdom; since the Korean War, they had not recognized the legitimacy of the Pyongyang government and would not fly its flag or play its national anthem. The problem was only partly solved before the start of the competition in July 1966; the North Korean flag was flown alongside those of the other participants, but the national anthem was not played before the team's matches.

In the 1966 FIFA World Cup, they were drawn into group 4, along with the USSR, Italy and Chile, the first time North Korea would face teams from another continent. The Chollimas lost their first game against the Soviets, then managed a 1–1 draw against Chile (Pak Seung-zin scoring North Korea's first goal at a World Cup). The last match, against the Italian double world champions, was crucial, as the winner would obtain their ticket to the quarter-finals. The discipline of Myung Rye-hyun's men managed to secure them a historic 1–0 upset victory with a goal from Pak Doo-ik. This was the first time an Asian team qualified for the quarter-finals of a World Cup. At the same time, the public began to take an interest in these disciplined players from a closed country. They were cheered on by locals in the town of Middlesbrough, where they were housed, including the team's star players, Pak Seung-zin and Pak Doo-ik. In the quarter-finals, North Korea faced Portugal, which had eliminated reigning world champions Brazil in the group stage. After 25 minutes of play, the Koreans led 3–0 (goals from Pak Seung-zin, Yang Seung-kook and Li Dong-woon) but began to lose their discipline. Portuguese star player Eusébio went on to score four goals, and José Augusto added another to defeat North Korea 5–3. When the North Korean players returned home, the crowd cheered them on as heroes. Pak Seung-zin remains North Korea's top scorer in the FIFA World Cup with two goals in four games.

Thirty-five years later, British director Dan Gordon and North Korea specialist Nicholas Bonner (Koryo Tours), made a film called The Game of Their Lives after finding the seven surviving players of the 1966 side, who had become favourites with the British public and were celebrated as heroes on their return to their country. The film screened in North Korea and South Korea and received the award for Best Sports Documentary from the Royal Television Society.. In 2002, Gordon and Bonner brought the team back to the site of their victory in Middlesbrough.

=== After the FIFA World Cup (1967–1980) ===
Following the FIFA World Cup, North Korea only rarely took part in the qualifying campaigns for the various continental and world tournaments. The Chollimas forfeited the 1968 Olympic qualifiers, and failed to enter the 1968 AFC Asian Cup qualification and 1970 FIFA World Cup qualifiers when they refused to face the Israeli team in the second round of the playoffs. Between their World Cup quarter-final and 1971, they played only one friendly against Algeria, losing 3–1 in Algiers. This meeting was the first in the history of the North Korean team against an African side.

The North Koreans played their first official game since 1966 in 1972, as part of the 1972 Olympic qualifiers. They defeated Syria and Iraq, but ended up losing against Iran 2–0 in a play-off match, following 0–0 draws in both of the first two legs. They decided again not to register for the 1972 AFC Asian Cup qualifiers. In May 1973, Pak Seung-zin's men were in Tehran to play the first phase of the 1974 FIFA World Cup qualifiers. They were in Group 2, along with host nation Iran, Syria and Kuwait. The team finished third in the group, behind the Iranians, who qualified for the rest of the competition, and Syria.

North Korea took part in Asian Cup qualification for the first time in 1976. Placed in group 4-B, with Japan and Singapore, the Chollimas finished first, then beat Hong Kong in the semi-finals, ensuring their participation in the tournament proper, then beating China in the final match. But, like Saudi Arabia and Thailand, the North Koreans withdrew and missed the opportunity to take part in the continental tournament for the first time.

The following year, under the direction of former striker Pak Doo-ik, the team qualified for the Olympic football tournament for the second time. They finished first during qualification and advanced following a penalty shootout against Indonesia. In Montreal, they were placed in Group 3 with hosts Canada and the USSR. The North Koreans beat Canada 3–1, then lost to the Soviets 0–3, but still qualified for the quarter-finals in second. They failed again at this stage, suffering a heavy 5-0 defeat against future silver medalist team Poland. They played the last half hour with ten men against the Poles, led by Grzegorz Lato and Andrzej Szarmach, who each scored twice.

The following two qualifying campaigns, for the 1978 FIFA World Cup and for the 1980 Olympics, were failures. The former was cut short with a withdrawal for diplomatic reasons, the North Koreans finding themselves in the same qualifying group as their southern neighbors, and in 1980, the Chollimas finished in 4th place in Group 3 of the pre-tournament, overtaken by Iran, Singapore and China.

In 1980, this time with Yang Seung-kook on the bench, the North Koreans took part in 1980 AFC Asian Cup qualification which saw successes against Thailand and Malaysia. They finished in second place in Group 1 of the 1980 AFC Asian Cup, behind defending champions Iran. In the semi-finals, they faced South Korea in an event of both sporting and political significance. After opening the scoring early, North Korea conceded two goals by Chung Hae-won in the last ten minutes and saw their journey come to an end in the semi-final, their best performance in the Asian Cup of Nations. The game for third place was a disaster, with a 3–0 defeat against Iran.

=== From one Asian Cup to another (1981–1992) ===
In 1980, with former international Han Bong-zin on the bench, the North Koreans moved on to 1982 FIFA World Cup qualification. After finishing top of their group (ahead of Hong Kong and Singapore), they eliminated Japan in the semi-finals but lost to China in the group final, ending any hopes of qualification. The following year, the selection participated in the 1982 Asian Games. North Korean progressed through the first round (drawing against Syria and Saudi Arabia and victory against Thailand), then beat Japan in the quarter-finals. They lost in extra time in the semi-finals, against Kuwait. The end of the match was extremely turbulent as the North Korean players attacked Thai referee Vijit Getkaew. The penalties from the AFC were heavy with a two-year suspension, which began as soon as the match ended, therefore they did not even play the match for the bronze medal, which automatically went to Saudi Arabia, the other unfortunate semi-finalists. The immediate consequence of this decision by the AFC, was the disqualification of North Korea from the 1984 AFC Asian Cup qualifiers and from the 1984 Olympic qualifiers which were boycotted by North Korea.

The selection therefore spent almost four years without playing official matches. For the 1986 FIFA World Cup qualifiers, they entered Group 4 alongside Japan and Singapore, two nations they had beaten four years previously. This time, it was the Japanese, led by Hiromi Hara, who finished top of the group and continued their qualifying campaign.

In 1988, North Korea did not participate in the 1988 Olympic tournament. North Korea had initially asked to be involved in the Games, a request refused by the International Olympic Committee, resulting in their boycott of the Games. As for the 1988 AFC Asian Cup qualification, North Korea only placed third in their qualifying group, behind Syria and Iran, both of which qualified for the tournament.

In 1990, North Korea took part in the inaugural 1990 Dynasty Cup. North Korea finished in third place. The following year, in the 1990 FIFA World Cup qualifiers, North Korea finished top of their first-round pool, winning all three of their home matches. In the final round, North Korea finished last, winning only one game, against Qatar.

Two years later, in 1991, the federation hired a foreign manager for the first time: Hungarian Pál Csernai, the former coach of Bayern Munich. North Korea finished the 1992 AFC Asian Cup qualification in first, ahead of Macao, Hong Kong and Chinese Taipei. It thus qualified for the Asian Cup for the second time, twelve years after its successful debut in Kuwait. Csernai's team were drawn into Group 1, along with hosts Japan, Iran and the United Arab Emirates. This time, their tournament ended in the first round, finishing without a win and with only two goals scored, both by Kim Kwang-min.

North Korea entered 1992 Olympic qualifiers after two consecutive withdrawals. Placed in Group E, Pyongyang was chosen, along with Beijing, to host the qualifying matches. Once again, the final tournament escaped them, finishing in second place behind China. Right after the Games, the team took part in the 1992 Dynasty Cup. Like two years before, the team finished on the third step of the podium, behind Japan and South Korea.

=== Withdrawal period (1993–2005) ===
Invigorated by their participation in the final phase of the 1992 AFC Asian Cup, Csernai's men turned to qualification for the 1994 FIFA World Cup. Placed into Group C, North Korea finished undefeated, ahead of Qatar, Singapore, Indonesia and Vietnam. The next round took the form of a single pool bringing together the six winners of the first round, the matches again held in Doha. Unfortunately for the North Koreans, after an inaugural victory against Iraq (3–2), they suffered four defeats in a row. Csernai left his post after the last meeting and left for Europe without returning to Pyongyang, and the federation put the national team on hold for more than four years. During this period, which saw North Korea tumble in the FIFA rankings, they choose not to register for any competition. This period of withdrawal coincided with the North Korean famine (1994–1998), which caused hundreds of thousands of deaths, as well as the official three-year mourning following the death of President Kim Il Sung in 1994 and the accession to power of his son Kim Jong Il.

North Korea made their return to official games in 2000 AFC Asian Cup qualification. Placed into Group 8 along with Thailand, Malaysia and Chinese Taipei, Myong Dong-chan's men only lost to the Thais, and booked their ticket for the final tournament. They continued with the 2000 Olympic qualification but they finished second in their group, failing to advance. Following this, the federation again decided to sideline the team, withdrawing it from the qualifiers for the 2002 FIFA World Cup and for the 2003 EAFC.

In 2003, it was with Yun Jong-su on the bench that the North Koreans started the 2004 AFC Asian Cup qualification. After a preliminary round where they defeated the Indian team, the Chollimas finished last in the second round. These playoffs were marked by two incidents: first, during the game against Iran, where the North Koreans left the field as a result of smoke bombs which landed on the field; second, when North Korea refused to issue the Jordanian players visas, leading to the AFC granting Jordan a 3–0 victory and suspending North Korea from all competition in Asia for a year, including the 2007 AFC Asian Cup.

In 2005, the North Koreans returned to the 2006 FIFA World Cup qualifiers, twelve years after their last campaign. Placed in Group 5 in the second round, they finished top. In the next round, they saw their journey come to an end, finishing last behind Japan, Iran, and Bahrain. A few months later, North Korea returned to the 2005 East Asian Football Championship, thirteen years after their last participation. In the qualifying round, the North Koreans broke their record for biggest victory with a 21–0 victory against Guam. As in the 1990 and 1992 editions, the Chollimas finished on the podium, in third place, behind China and Japan, whom they beat 1–0 in the first match of the final round.

=== First title and return to the FIFA World Cup (2006–2010) ===
The sanction imposed by the AFC on North Korea deprived it of participation in the qualifications for the 2007 AFC Asian Cup. With coach Kim Jong-hun at its head, the selection entered the 2008 AFC Challenge Cup, a competition reserved for so-called developing nations by the AFC and whose winner obtained direct qualification for the 2011 AFC Asian Cup. The North Korean selection had a good run which ended on the third step of the podium, after a defeat in the semi-finals against Tajikistan then a big success (4–0) in the third-placed match against Myanmar.

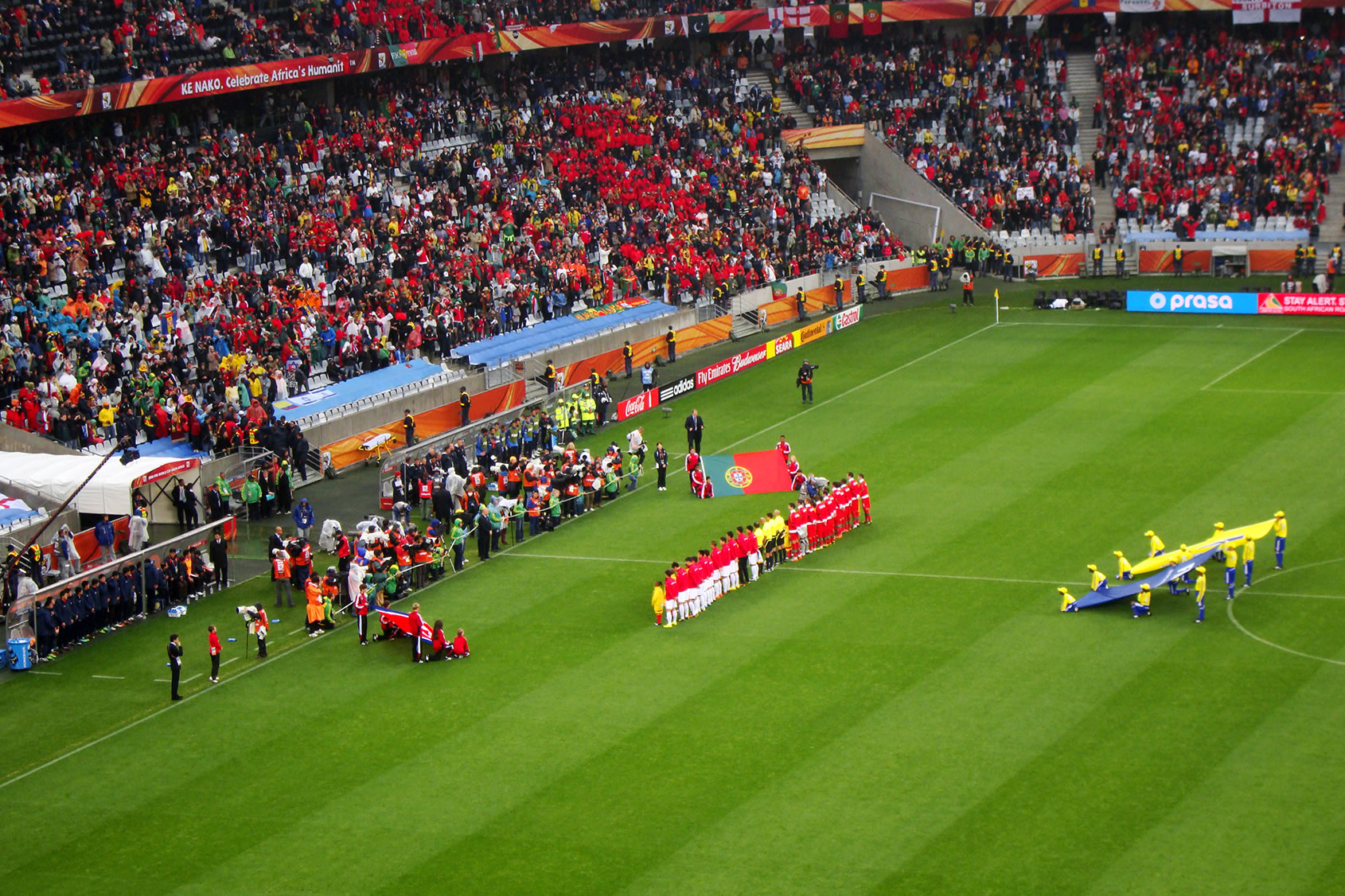
North Korea and Portugal players before their 2010 FIFA World Cup group match, in which North Korea suffered its heaviest-ever defeat.

In the 2010 FIFA World Cup qualifiers, the Chollimas easily dismissed Mongolia (4–1 and 5–1) then finished second behind South Korea, without any defeats or even conceding a goal in the third round. North Korea again finished second behind South Korea in the fourth round, thus qualifying for the FIFA World Cup for only the second time after a 44-year hiatus. During these qualifiers there were diplomatic incidents with South Korea after Kim Jong Il refused to have the South Korean national anthem played, or even to fly the flag in the country, the two meetings against the Taeguk Warriors had to be relocated to China. At the end of the year, the North Koreans managed to qualify for the 2008 East Asian Football Championship, after beating Hong Kong. During this four-man final phase played in Chongqing, China, they finished last, with two draws (against Japan and South Korea, who won the tournament, and a defeat against China).

To prepare for the FIFA World Cup and get used to the European style of play, the North Korean selection organized a preparation camp in the fall of 2009 in France. On this occasion, they played two friendly matches: against Nantes on 9 October at La Roche-sur-Yon then against Congo on 13 October at Le Mans.

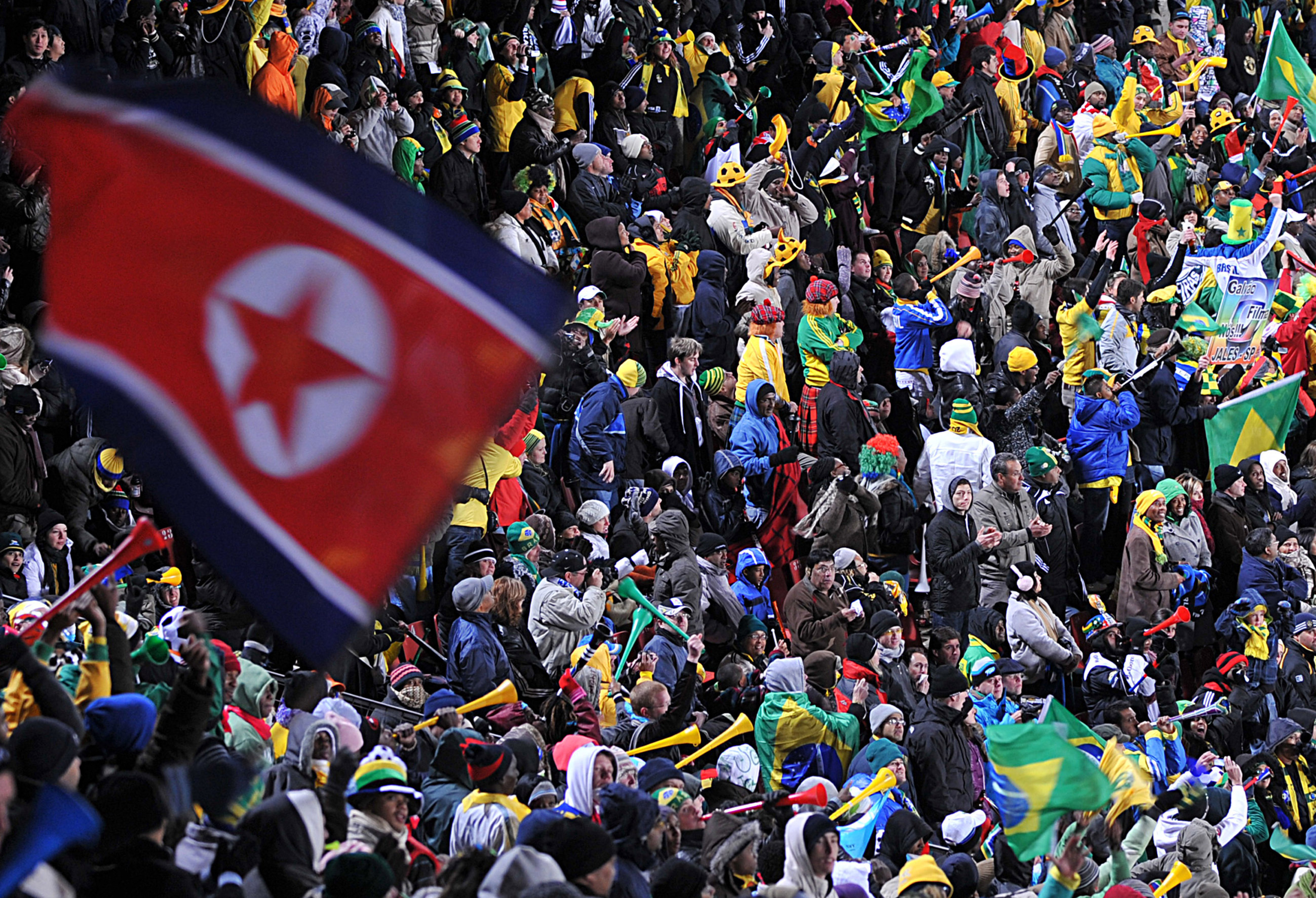
North Korea's flag at the 2010 FIFA World Cup.

In early 2010, a few months before the FIFA World Cup, North Korea participated in the 2010 AFC Challenge Cup with the winner automatically qualifying for the final phase of the 2011 AFC Asian Cup. The Chollimas, still led by Kim Jong-hun, had an excellent run in the competition. After finishing top of their first round group, ahead of Turkmenistan, they swept Myanmar 5–0 in the semi-finals before winning, after the penalty shootout, again facing the Turkmens in the final. This success allowed them to secure a place in the continental finals, ten years after their last participation. It was also the first title obtained by the men's national team. The following month, in February, the North Koreans engaged in the 2010 East Asian Football Championship where they entered in the second round. For the first time, they did not reach the final pool, beaten on goal difference by Hong Kong.

With a final pre-tournament ranking of 105th, North Korea were the lowest-ranked team at the 2010 FIFA World Cup. They were drawn in Group G alongside Brazil, Portugal, and Ivory Coast, in what some commentators referred to as a "Group of death". After a 2–1 defeat against Brazil with Ji Yun-nam scoring the only goal for North Korea in the FIFA World Cup, North Korea were eliminated after losing 7–0 to Portugal, the heaviest defeat in the team's history. After trailing 1–0 at halftime, they conceded six goals in the second half. The match was shown live in North Korea - an exceptionally rare occurrence for a foreign broadcast - but the broadcast was interrupted after Portugal's fourth goal. North Korea went on to lose their final match against Ivory Coast 3–0 to record the worst performance of any team at that year's FIFA World Cup.

After the FIFA World Cup, Radio Free Asia reported based on anonymous reports that coach Kim Jong-hun had been punished by being sent to forced labor camps, while some players had been subjected to "harsh ideological criticism". In 2024, retired midfielder An Yong-hak said such reports are a hoax.

=== Successes and difficult times (2011–2022) ===
Six months after the FIFA World Cup, North Korea entered the 2011 AFC Asian Cup. The team managed to draw 0–0 against the United Arab Emirates and two 1–0 defeats against Iran and Iraq. In the fall, the North Koreans entered the 2014 FIFA World Cup qualifiers, with the hope of participating in a second consecutive tournament. They did not enter the competition until the third round, finding themselves in the same group as Japan, Uzbekistan and Tajikistan (which benefited from the disqualification of Syria). The Chollimas finished in 3rd place of the group. The round featured the first meeting of the Japanese team and their North Korean counterparts in Pyongyang in 22 years. 150 Japanese supporters were allowed to be present but they received four-hour checks upon their arrival at Pyongyang International Airport, an "icy" reception at Kim Il Sung Stadium, where they were warned not to wave Japanese flags, and had their national anthem booed by the North Korean crowd.

In March 2012, the North Koreans defended the 2012 AFC Challenge Cup with the possibility again to qualify for the 2015 AFC Asian Cup. The Chollimas advance to the finals after finishing top of their qualifying group, along with Nepal. In the semi-finals, they beat Palestine and then managed to retain their title, following their success in the final against Turkmenistan. This victory assured them of a second consecutive participation in the AFC Asian Cup, which was a first.

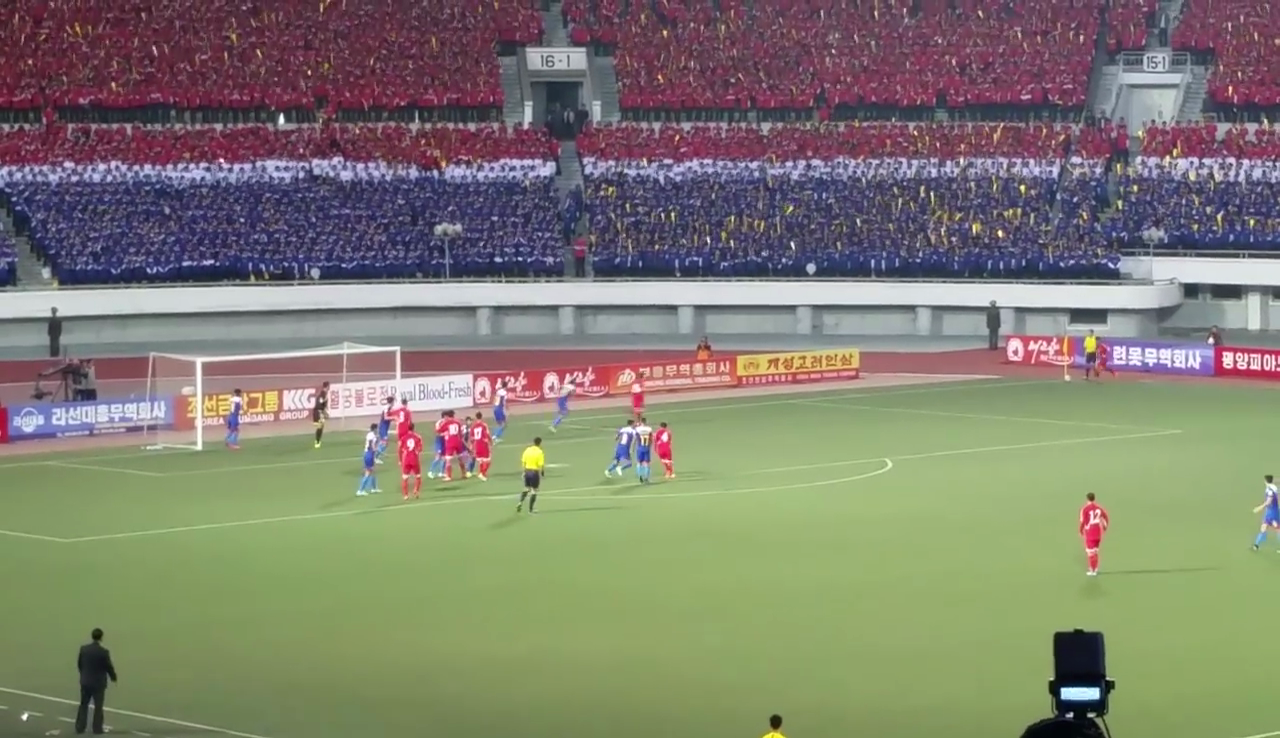
North Korea against Philippines at the 2018 FIFA World Cup qualification.

The team enjoyed a two-year unbeaten run, after the home defeat against Uzbekistan in the 2014 FIFA World Cup qualifiers. The Chollimas played in the second round of the 2013 EAFF East Asian Cup but failed to advance on goal difference, coming second to Australia. In November 2013, the unbeaten streak ended with a loss to Kuwait (2–1). They managed to finish first in the 2015 EAFF East Asian Cup qualifying pool, getting their ticket to the finals for the first time since 2008.

A few weeks before the star of the 2015 AFC Asian Cup, the North Korean federation relieved Yun Jong-su of his duties, following his suspension of one year decided by the AFC. Jong-su was penalized for his unsportsmanlike behaviour towards the referees during the Asian Games soccer tournament final against South Korea. North Korea left the competition at the end of the group stage, after losing their three matches. Following this competition, the team restored its image by winning several friendly matches before finishing on the podium of the 2015 EAFF East Asian Cup, including a prestigious victory over Japan (2–1).

In the 2018 FIFA World Cup qualifiers, North Korea got off to a flying start by winning their first three games, but failed to qualify for the 3rd round, following a defeat to the Philippines at the very end of the match (2–3, having led 2–1 until the 85th minute) during the final match. North Korea finished in second place in their group with 16 points, but this defeat prevented the Chollima from finishing among the four best runners-up and advancing to the next round. This led to the dismissal of Kim Chang-bok, replaced by Jørn Andersen, the second European coach to manage North Korea after the Hungarian Pál Csernai. The early elimination in World Cup qualifying meant that North Korea had to enter the 3rd qualifying round for the 2019 AFC Asian Cup. This qualifying campaign gave rise to a triple postponement by the AFC of the home match against Malaysia, at the request of the Malaysian Federation, fearing the poisoning of its players if they went to North Korea following diplomatic tensions between the two countries - linked to the assassination of Kim Jong-nam, the North Korean leader's half-brother, at Kuala Lumpur airport on 13 February 2017. The meetings between the two teams were finally held on neutral ground in Thailand, where North Korea needed two victories to give them a chance to qualify, dominating Malaysia (4–1 and 4–1). At the 2017 EAFF E-1 Football Championship, the Chollima failed to win a single match and finished 4th and last in the final round, with two opening losses against Japan and South Korea (0–1 each time) before ending the competition in a draw (1–1) against China.

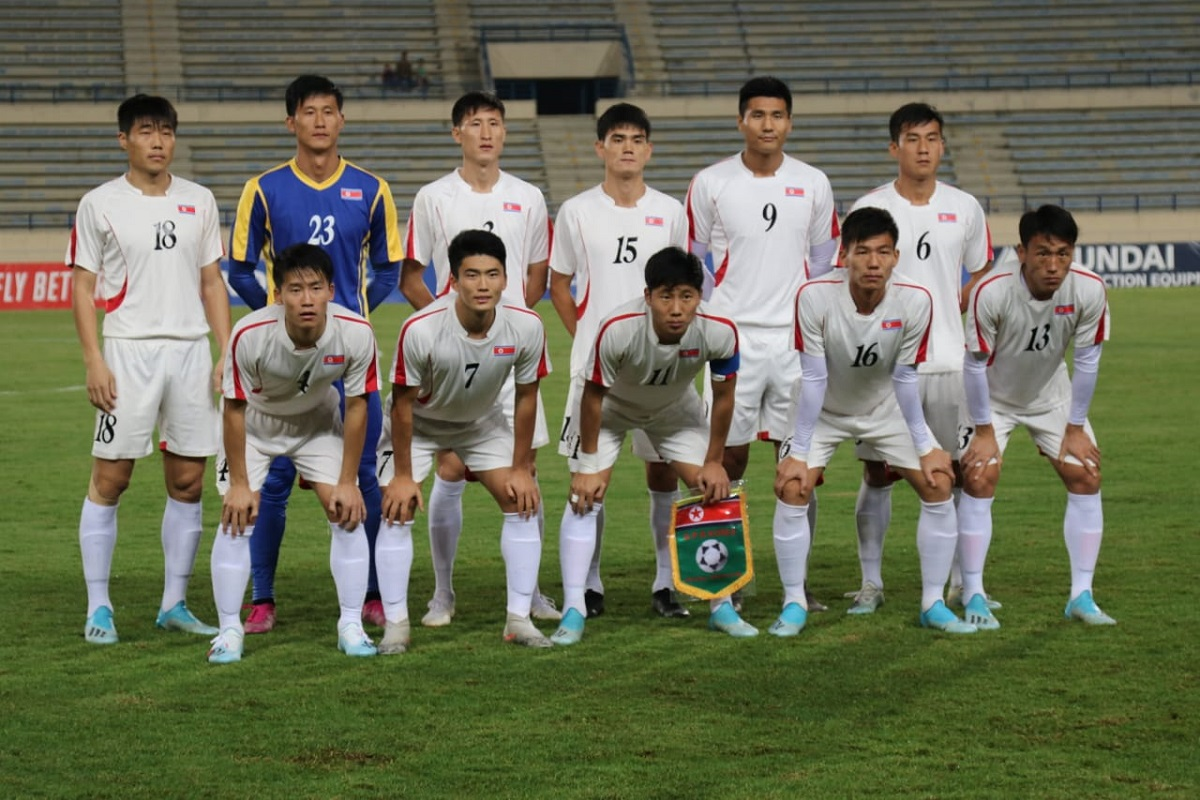
North Korea players line-up against Lebanon at the 2022 FIFA World Cup qualification.

In the 2019 AFC Asian Cup, North Korea were swept away by Saudi Arabia (0–4), Qatar (6–0, suffering the second heaviest defeat in its history) and against Lebanon (1–4), leaving the competition with the worst record of the 24 teams involved (three defeats in as many games played, only one goal scored, 14 conceded, and two red cards received). North Korea then participated in the 2nd round of the 2022 FIFA World Cup qualifiers and beat Lebanon (2–0) thanks to a double from Jong Il-gwan. North Korea managed to follow up with a narrow victory in Sri Lanka five days later (1–0) with a goal by Jang Kuk-chol before facing South Korea. For the first time since a friendly match in 1990 and for the first time in a qualifier, the meeting between the two Koreas took place in Pyongyang, however the match was not televised live and no Korean supporters or foreign journalists were allowed to attend the match, which ended in a scoreless draw (0–0), leaving the two teams at the top of Pool H tied. Following the match against their rivals, they lost for the first time in their history against Turkmenistan (1–3) but managed to beat Lebanon 2–0. Five days later, they played Lebanon again, drawing 0–0, preserving their chances of qualifying for the next round. However, North Korea withdrew from qualifying due to fears related to the COVID-19 pandemic. FIFA and the AFC announced that all results of matches played by North Korea since the start of the 2nd qualifying round and 2023 AFC Asian Cup were void and would not count towards qualification, thus North Korea would not play in the 2023 AFC Asian Cup, their first miss out from the event since 2007.

=== Return after a long hiatus (2023–present) ===
In August 2023, North Korea announced interest in returning to sporting competitions, including football, and signaled interest in joining the 2026 FIFA World Cup qualification. North Korea found themselves in Group B of the second round against Japan, Syria and Myanmar. The country's move was confirmed by FIFA and the AFC as North Korea sought to enhance its football reputation, already damaged due to the isolation related to the pandemic. After more than 5 years of inactive international football, North Korea played against Syria on 16 November 2023, a game Syria won 1–0. On 21 November, North Korea defeated Myanmar 6–1 at the Thuwunna Stadium, with Jong Il-gwan scoring a hat-trick in the match.

The team advanced to the final round of the FIFA World Cup qualification for the first time since 2010, and qualified to the AFC Asian Cup for the 2027 edition, after missing out in 2023. However, they would finish last in their FIFA World Cup qualifying group, eliminating them from contention.

== Team image ==
Between 2014 and January 2024, the official kit provider for the North Korean national teams was the North Korean sports company Ch'oeusu. In January 2024, Chinese sports brand Inlang became the official kit sponsor.

Period	Kit Provider
1985–1988	(United Kingdom) Admiral
1989-1990	(Germany) Adidas
1991-1992	(Japan) Mizuno
1993–1997	(United Kingdom) Admiral
1998–2002	(Italy) Fila
2002–2003	(Italy) Lotto
2003–2005	(Germany) Adidas
2005–2006	(United Kingdom) Umbro
2006–2008	(Denmark) Hummel
2008–2010	(China) Erke
2010–2014	(Italy) Legea
2014–2024	(North Korea) Ch'oeusu
2024–present	(China) Inlang

=== Stadium ===
North Korea plays their home matches at the Rungrado 1st of May Stadium on Rungra Island, Pyongyang. It is the second largest stadium in the world with a capacity of 114,000. However, North Korea mostly used the Kim Il Sung Stadium in Pyongyang as their main stadium. Since 2019, North Korea has hosted their home matches in neutral venues.

North Korea national football team home stadiums
Image	Stadium	Capacity	Location	Last match
	Rungrado 1st of May Stadium	114,000	Pyongyang	v Jordan (14 June 2008; 2010 FIFA World Cup qualification)
	Kim Il Sung Stadium	50,000	Pyongyang	v South Korea (15 October 2019; 2022 FIFA World Cup qualification)

=== Neutral venues ===
List of neutral venues for North Korea in the FIFA World Cup qualifications and AFC Asian Cup qualifications.

North Korea neutral home stadiums
Image	Stadium	Capacity	Location	Last match
	New Laos National Stadium	25,000	Vientiane, Laos	v Uzbekistan (19 November 2024; 2026 FIFA World Cup qualification)
	Prince Faisal bin Fahd Sports City Stadium	22,188	Riyadh, Saudi Arabia	v Kyrgyzstan (5 June 2025; 2026 FIFA World Cup qualification)

== Results and fixtures ==
The following is a list of match results in the last 12 months, as well as any future matches that have been scheduled.

Win Draw Loss Fixture

=== 2026 ===
17 January Hybrid friendly	Chongqing Handa (China)	0–8	North Korea	Chongqing, China
--:-- UTC+8

21 January Hybrid friendly	Dynamo Vladivostok (Russia)	0–0	North Korea	Kunming, China
--:-- UTC+8				Stadium: Kunming Hongta Stadium

24 January Hybrid friendly	Yunnan Yukun (China)	1–3	North Korea	Yuxi, China
--:-- UTC+8	Maritu

=== 2027 ===
December 2027 Asian Cup Group B	Bahrain	v	North Korea	Riyadh, Saudi Arabia
--:-- UTC+3				Stadium: Imam Mohammed Ibn Saud University Stadium

December 2027 Asian Cup Group B	North Korea	v	Uzbekistan	Riyadh, Saudi Arabia
--:-- UTC+3				Stadium: Kingdom Arena

=== 2028 ===
January 2027 Asian Cup Group B	North Korea	v	Jordan	Riyadh, Saudi Arabia
--:-- UTC+3				Stadium: Imam Mohammed Ibn Saud University Stadium

== Coaching staff ==
Role	Name
Head coach	(North Korea) Ri Kwang-chon
Technical director	(North Korea) Yun Jong-su
Assistant coaches	(North Korea) Kim Yong-jun (North Korea) Hong Yong-jo
Goalkeeping coach	(North Korea) Ri Myong-guk
Match analyst	(North Korea) Choe Gwan-il
Performance coach	(North Korea) Pak Kuk-myong
Team doctors	(North Korea) Jang Il-bom (North Korea) Song Jong-chol
Physiotherapists	(North Korea) Choe Nam-kuk (North Korea) Kim Myong-il (North Korea) Ri Song-pyong (North Korea) Yun Kuk-hyong
Team coordinator	(North Korea) Ri Chol-myong

=== Coaching history ===
- (North Korea) Myung Rye-hyun (1960–1966)
- (North Korea) Pak Doo-ik (1976–1977,1986–1989)
- (North Korea) Pak Du-sok (1978–1979,1982)
- (North Korea) Yang Song-guk (1980)
- (North Korea) Han Bong-zin (1980–1981)
- (North Korea) Yun Myung-chan (1992–1993)
- (Hungary) Pál Csernai (1993)
- (North Korea) Yun Jong-su (1999–2005, 2006–2008, 2011–2014, 2019–2022) (2019 AFC Asian Cup)
- (North Korea) Ri Jong-man (2001–2003, 2006–2007)
- (North Korea) Kim Myong-Song (2004–2006)
- (North Korea) Kim Jong-hun (2007–2010) (2010 FIFA World Cup)
- (North Korea) Jo Tong-sop (2010–2011, 2014–2015) (2015 AFC Asian Cup)
- (North Korea) Kim Chang-bok (2015–2016)
- (Norway) Jørn Andersen (2016–2018)
- (North Korea) Kim Yong-jun (2018–2019)
- (North Korea) Sin Yong-nam (2023–present)

== Players ==
=== Current squad ===
The following players were called up for the 2026 FIFA World Cup qualification games against Kyrgyzstan and Iran in June 2025.

- All caps and goals as of 10 June 2025, after match against Iran.

No.	Pos.	Player	Date of birth (age)	Caps	Goals	Club
1	GK	Kang Ju-hyok	31 May 1997 (age 29)	16	0	(DPR Korea Football Association) Hwaebul
18	GK	Hong Kil-ryong	1 July 2005 (age 21)	0	0	(DPR Korea Football Association) Hwaebul
21	GK	Yu Kwang-jun	5 November 2000 (age 26)	2	0	(DPR Korea Football Association) Ryomyong
2	DF	Kim Jin-hyok	25 March 2002 (age 24)	4	0	(DPR Korea Football Association) Sonbong
3	DF	Jang Kuk-chol (captain)	16 February 1994 (age 32)	75	5	(DPR Korea Football Association) Hwaebul
5	DF	Jong Hwi-nam	15 May 2003 (age 23)	3	0	(DPR Korea Football Association) Ryomyong
12	DF	Choe Ryong-il	23 March 2004 (age 22)	4	0	(DPR Korea Football Association) Ryomyong
16	DF	Kim Yu-song	18 July 2003 (age 23)	16	2	(DPR Korea Football Association) Amnokgang
19	DF	Kim Sung-hye	15 January 2003 (age 23)	6	0	(DPR Korea Football Association) Sonbong
23	DF	Jong Kum-song	24 January 1997 (age 29)	6	0	(DPR Korea Football Association) Rimyongsu
6	MF	Kye Tam	6 October 2000 (age 26)	6	0	(DPR Korea Football Association) Ryomyong
8	MF	Sin Kwang-nam	1 November 2003 (age 23)	2	0	(DPR Korea Football Association) Rimyongsu
15	MF	Ra Myong-song	6 January 2003 (age 23)	5	0	(DPR Korea Football Association) Amnokgang
17	MF	Kang Kuk-chol	29 September 1999 (age 27)	29	1	(DPR Korea Football Association) Rimyongsu
20	MF	Paek Chung-song	25 February 2000 (age 26)	16	0	(DPR Korea Football Association) Ryomyong
22	MF	Han Chung-guk	28 March 2002 (age 24)	1	0	(DPR Korea Football Association) April 25
4	FW	Ri Kum-chol	26 March 2004 (age 22)	2	0	(DPR Korea Football Association) Ryomyong
7	FW	Kim Kuk-jin	11 October 2000 (age 26)	12	0	(DPR Korea Football Association) Kigwancha
9	FW	Ri Jo-guk	9 May 2002 (age 24)	11	4	(DPR Korea Football Association) Ryomyong
10	FW	Ri Il-song	14 January 2004 (age 22)	14	4	(DPR Korea Football Association) Ryomyong
11	FW	Pak Kwang-hun	18 April 1997 (age 29)	7	2	(DPR Korea Football Association) Rimyongsu
13	FW	Choe Kuk	21 March 2005 (age 21)	3	0	(DPR Korea Football Association) Wolmido
14	FW	Ryang Kwang-myong	26 January 2003 (age 23)	3	0	(DPR Korea Football Association) Amnokgang

=== Recent call-ups ===
The following players have been called up for the team within the last 12 months and are still available for selection.

Pos.	Player	Date of birth (age)	Caps	Goals	Club	Latest call-up
Notes: ^{INJ} = Withdrawn due to injury.; ^{PRE} = Preliminary squad/standby.; ^{SUS} = Serving suspension

== Records ==
As of 10 June 2025.
Players in bold are still active with North Korea.

=== Most appearances ===
Rank	Name	Caps	Goals	Career
1	Ri Myong-guk	118	0	2007–2019
2	**Jong Il-gwan**	85	31	2011–present
3	Pak Nam-chol	77	15	2004–2012
4	**Jang Kuk-chol**	75	5	2011–present
5	Ri Kwang-chon	70	1	2001–2012
6	Kim Yong-jun	62	8	2001–2011
7	Pak Song-chol	58	13	2007–2017
8	Mun In-guk	55	6	2004–2011
8	Tak Yong-bin	55	2	1985–1993
10	Jon Kwang-ik	53	2	2007–2016

=== Top goalscorers ===
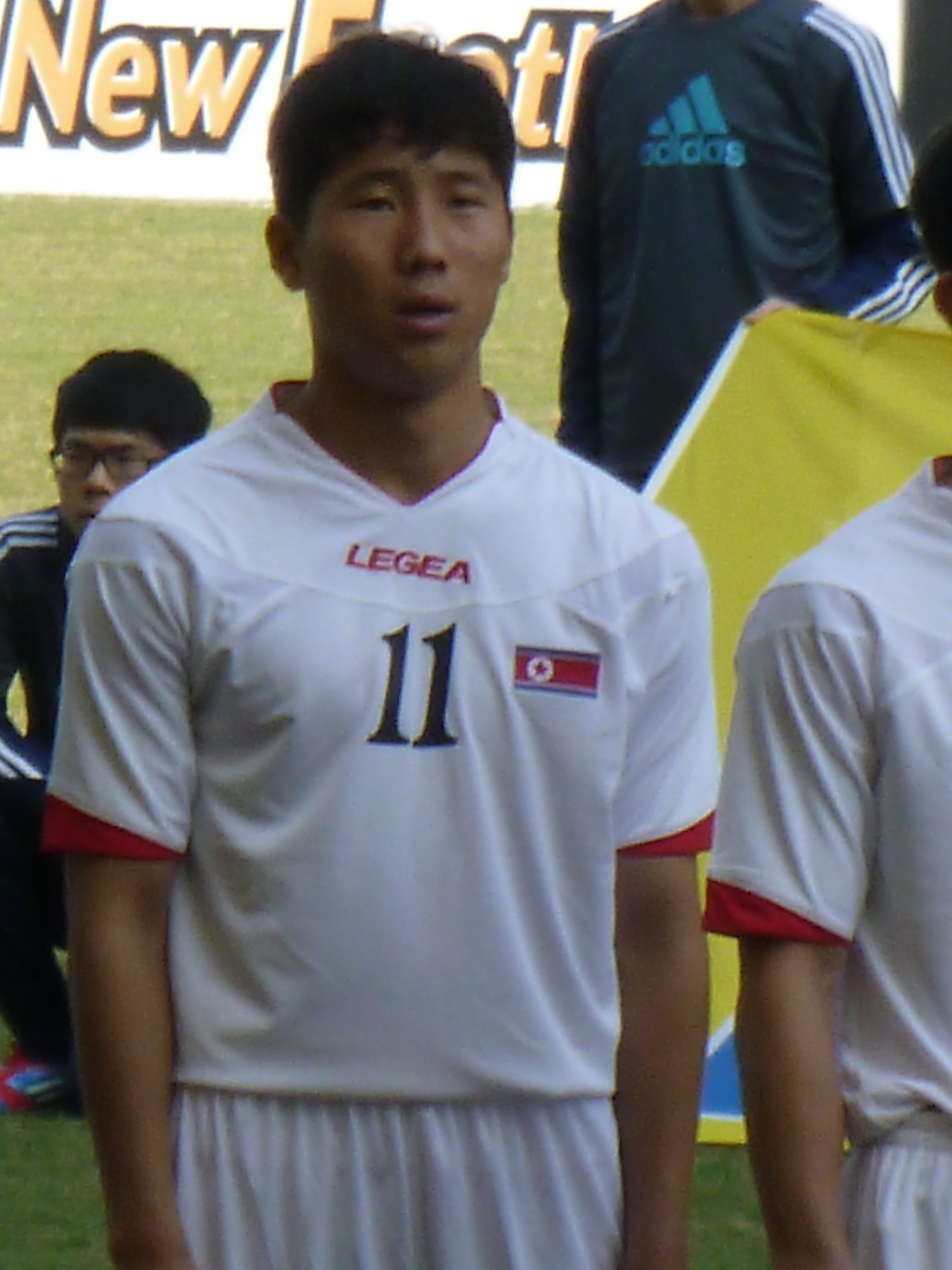
Jong Il-gwan is North Korea's top goalscorer with 31 goals.

Rank	Player	Goals	Caps	Ratio	Career
1	**Jong Il-gwan**	31	85	0.36	2011–present
2	Jong Tae-se	15	33	0.45	2007–2011
2	Pak Nam-chol	15	77	0.19	2004–2012
4	Pak Kwang-ryong	14	43	0.33	2009–2023
5	Hong Yong-jo	13	51	0.25	2002–2011
5	Pak Song-chol	13	58	0.22	2007–2017
7	Choe Chol-man	11	21	0.52	2005–2010
8	Choi Yong-son	10	29	0.34	1990–1993
9	Kang Jin-hyok	9	6	1.5	2005–2007
9	An Chol-hyok	9	29	0.31	2005–2011

== North Korea records and statistics ==
- North Korea first match: - v China, 7 October 1956
- North Korea first goals scored: - Trucktown - v China, 7 October 1956
- Most matches played in one day: 2 - 24 June 2007
- Most red cards: 2 - Jong Il-gwan - 2011-present
- North Korea player sent off: (13 times)
  - Nam Song-chol - v Iran, 30 March 2005 (87th minute)
  - Kim Yong-Su - v Japan, 8 June 2005 (91st minute)
  - Ri Chol-myong - v Japan, 28 October 2007 (58th minute)
  - Kim Yong-Jun - v Saudi Arabia, 17 June 2009 (94th minute)
  - Cha Jong-Hyok - v Nigeria, 6 June 2010 (79th minute)
  - Pak Kwang-ryong - v Japan, 2 September 2011 (84th minute)
  - Jong Il-gwan - v Japan, 15 November 2011 (78th minute)
  - Ri Yong-jik - v Saudi Arabia, 14 January 2015 (76th minute)
  - Kim Chol-bom - v Lebanon, 10 October 2017 (82nd minute)
  - Han Kwang-song - v Saudi Arabia, 8 January 2019 (44th minute)
  - Jong Il-gwan - v Qatar, 13 January 2019 (90th minute)
  - Jang Kuk-chol - v Qatar, 10 September 2024 (27th minute)
  - Kye Tam - v Iran, 10 June 2025 (66th minute)
- Longest winning streak: 11 - from 2 April 1964 to 30 November 1965
- Longest unbeaten streak: 19 - (2 times)
  - from 8 December 1960 to 30 November 1965
  - from 20 January 1993 to 15 October 1993
- Longest losing streak: 6 - from 29 December 2018 to 8 July 2019
- Longest winless streak: 12 - from 27 February 2010 to 24 September 2010
- Longest goalless streak: 405 minutes - from 15 October 2008 to 11 February 2009
- Longest clean sheet streak: 879 minutes - from 22 March 1964 to 21 November 1965
- Longest goalless streak by both teams: 282 minute - from 31 July 1990 to 26 September 1990
- Most appearances: 118 - Ri Myong-guk - 2007-2019
- Most appearances by a forward: 85 - Jong Il-gwan - 2011-present
- Most consecutive appearances: 22 - Ri Un-chol - from 13 October 2018 to 21 March 2024
- Top goalscorer: 31 - Jong Il-gwan - 2011-present
- Biggest win: 21 - v Guam, 11 March 2005 (5th biggest win in senior international matches)
- Biggest defeat: 7 - v Portugal, 21 June 2010
- Biggest North Korea upset win: - v Italy, 19 July 1966
- Largest comeback to win the match: 2 - v Qatar, 15 October 1993
- Largest blown lead to lose the match: 3 - v Portugal, 23 July 1966
- Most goals in a match: 21 - v Guam, 11 March 2005
- Most goals in first half: 10 - v Guam, 11 March 2005
- Most goals in second half: 11 - v Guam, 11 March 2005
- Most goals by both teams in a match: 21 - v Guam, 11 March 2005
- Most goals by both teams in first half: 10 - v Guam, 11 March 2005
- Most goals by both teams in second half: 11 - v Guam, 11 March 2005
- North Korea match ended scoreless draw: - (54 times) - Last matches played: - v Jordan, 27 August 2024
- Most goals conceded in a match: 7 - (2 times)
  - v Brazil, 26 February 1999
  - v Portugal, 21 June 2010
- Most goals conceded in first half: 3 - (5 times)
  - v Bulgaria, 30 April 1986
  - v Brazil, 26 February 1999
  - v Qatar, 13 January 2019
  - v Iran, 14 November 2024
  - v Qatar, 20 March 2025
- Most goals conceded in second half: 6 - v Portugal, 21 June 2010
- Most goals by a player in a match: 7 - Kim Kwang-hyok - v Guam, 11 March 2005
- Most goals by a player in first half: 3 - (2 times)
  - Jong Tae-se - v Mongolia, 19 June 2007
  - Jong Tae-se - v Macau, 21 June 2007
- Most goals by a player in second half: 5 - Kim Kwang-hyok - v Guam, 11 March 2005
- Most goals by a opponent player in a match: 4 - (2 times)
  - Eusébio - v Portugal, 23 July 1966
  - Almoez Ali - v Qatar, 13 January 2019
- Fastest goals: 1st minute - (2 times)
  - 50 seconds - Pak Seung-zin - v Portugal, 23 July 1966
  - Ri Han-jae - v Yemen, 13 October 2004
- Fastest goals conceded: 1st minute - (3 times)
  - Khalil Al-Malki - v Qatar, 2 May 1993
  - Mohd Faduhasny - v Singapore, 12 February 2002
  - Josh Borja - v Guam, 23 August 2009
- Fastest 2 goals to start the match: 4th minute - v Hong Kong, 27 May 1989
- Fastest 2 goals: 1 minutes - (6 times)
  - v Burma, 14 September 1974
  - v Bangladesh, 16 September 1980
  - v Hong Kong, 27 May 1989
  - v Vietnam, 9 April 1993
  - v Guam, 11 March 2005 (2 times)
- Fastest 2 goals conceded: 1 minutes - (3 times)
  - v Thailand, 4 April 2000
  - v Kuwait, 5 October 2002
  - v Jordan, 18 November 2003
- Fastest 2 goals conceded to start the match: 11th minute - v Qatar, 13 January 2019

=== FIFA World Cup records and statistics ===
- Lowest FIFA world ranking to qualified: 105th FIFA ranking - 2010 (FIFA World Cup records)
- Best results: 8th place - 1966
- Worst results: 32nd place - 2010
- Most consecutive failed qualification attempts: 10 - 1970-2006
- Longest unbeaten streak: 2 - from 15 July 1966 to 19 July 1966
- Longest losing streak: 4 - from 23 July 1966 to present
- Longest goalless streak: 181 minute - from 15 June 2010 to present
- Longest clean sheet streak: 179 minute - from 15 July 1966 to 23 July 1966
- Longest goalless streak by both teams: 64 minute - from 23 July 1966 to 15 June 2010
- Longest goalless streak by both teams in one tournament: 61 minute - v Ivory Coast, 25 June 2010
- Largest blown lead to lose the match: 3 - v Portugal, 23 July 1966
- Most goals: 2 - Pak Seung-zin - 1966
- Most appearances: 4 - (7 player)
  - Han Bong-Zin - 1966
  - Im Seung-Hwi - 1966
  - Li Chan-myung - 1966
  - Lim Zoong-Sun - 1966
  - Pak Doo-Ik - 1966
  - Pak Seung-Zin - 1966
  - Shin Yung-Kyoo - 1966
- Most matches lost: 3 - (11 player)
  - Ri Myong-guk - 2010
  - Ri Kwang-chon - 2010
  - Ri Jun-il - 2010
  - Ji Yun-nam - 2010
  - Jong Tae-se - 2010
  - Mun In-guk - 2010
  - Pak Chol-jin - 2010
  - Pak Nam-chol - 2010
  - Ri Chol-myong - 2010
  - Ri Kwang-chon - 2010
  - An Chol-hyok - 2010
  - Biggest win: 1 - v Italy, 19 July 1966
- Biggest defeat: 7 - v Portugal, 21 June 2010
- Most goals scored in a tournament: 5 - 1966
- Most goals scored in a tournament group stage: 2 - 1966
- Fewest goals scored in a tournament: 1 - 1966
- Most goals conceded in a tournament: 12 - 2010
- Fewest goals conceded in a tournament group stage: 4 - 1966
- Fewest goals conceded in a tournament: 9 - 1966
- Most goals scored by both teams in a tournament: 14 - 1966
- Most goals scored by both teams in a tournament group stage: 13 - 2010
- Fewest goals scored by both teams in a tournament: 13 - 2010
- Fewest goals scored by both teams in a tournament group stage: 6 - 1966
- Most clean sheet: 1 - Li Chan-myung - 1966
- Most clean sheet by opponent goalkeeper: 1 - (3 times)
  - Anzor Kavazashvili - v Soviet Union, 12 July 1966
  - Eduardo - v Portugal, 21 June 2010
  - Boubacar Barry - v Ivory Coast, 25 June 2010
- Opponent player awarded penalty kick: - (3 times)
  - Rubén Marcos - v Chile, 15 July 1966
  - Eusébio - v Portugal, 23 July 1966 (2 times)
- Most goals by a player in a match: 1 - (6 times)
  - Pak Seung-zin - v Chile, 15 July 1966
  - Pak Doo-ik - v Italy, 19 July 1966
  - Pak Seung-zin - v Portugal, 23 July 1966
  - Li Dong-woon - v Portugal, 23 July 1966
  - Yang Seung-kook - v Portugal, 23 July 1966
  - Ji Yun-nam - v Brazil, 15 June 2010
- Most goals by a player in first half: 1 - (4 times)
  - Pak Doo-ik - v Italy, 19 July 1966
  - Pak Seung-zin - v Portugal, 23 July 1966
  - Li Dong-woon - v Portugal, 23 July 1966
  - Yang Seung-kook - v Portugal, 23 July 1966
- Most goals by a player in second half: 1 - (2 times)
  - Pak Seung-zin - v Chile, 15 July 1966
  - Ji Yun-nam - v Brazil, 15 June 2010
- Most goals by a opponent player in a match: 4 - Eusébio - v Portugal, 23 July 1966
- Most goals by a opponent player in first half: 2 - Eusébio - v Portugal, 23 July 1966
- Most goals by a opponent player in second half: 2 - (2 times)
  - Eusébio - v Portugal, 23 July 1966
  - Tiago Mendes - v Portugal, 21 June 2010
- Most goals in a match: 3 - v Portugal, 23 July 1966
- Most goals in first half: 3 - v Portugal, 23 July 1966
- Most goals in second half: 1 - (2 times)
  - v Chile, 15 July 1966
  - v Brazil, 15 June 2010
- Most goals conceded in a match: 7 - v Portugal, 21 June 2010
- Most goals conceded in first half: 2 - (3 times)
  - v Soviet Union, 12 July 1996
  - v Portugal, 23 July 1966
  - v Ivory Coast, 25 June 2010
- Most goals conceded in second half: 6 - v Portugal, 21 June 2010
- Most goals by both teams in a match: 8 - v Portugal, 23 July 1966
- Most goals by both teams in first half: 5 - v Portugal, 23 July 1996
- Most goals by both teams in second half: 6 - v Portugal, 21 June 2010
- Fewest goals by both teams in a match: 1 - v Italy, 19 July 1966
- Most goals in a match: 3 - v Portugal, 23 July 1966
- Fastest goals: 50 seconds - Pak Seung-zin - v Portugal, 23 July 1966
- Fastest goals conceded: 14th minute - Yaya Touré - v Ivory Coast, 25 June 2010
- Fastest 2 goals: 3 minutes - v Portugal, 23 July 1966
- Fastest 2 goals to start the match: 22nd minute - v Portugal, 23 July 1966
- Fastest 2 goals conceded: 2 minute - (2 times)
  - v Soviet Union, 12 July 1966
  - v Portugal, 21 June 2010
- Fastest 2 goals conceded to start the match: 20th minute - v Ivory Coast, 25 June 2010
- Most saves in a match: 12 - Ri Myong-guk - v Ivory Coast, 25 June 2010
- Most saves by a opponent goalkeeper in a match: 4 - (2 times)
  - Eduardo - v Portugal, 21 June 2010
  - Boubacar Barry - v Ivory Coast, 25 June 2010
- Most shots in a match: 15 - v Portugal, 21 June 2010
- Fewest shots in a match: 8 - v Ivory Coast, 25 June 2010
- Most shots allowed in a match: 28 - v Ivory Coast, 25 June 2010
- Fewest shots allowed in a match: 26 - (2 times)
  - v Brazil, 15 June 2010
  - v Portugal, 21 June 2010
- Most shots by both teams in a match: 41 - v Portugal, 21 June 2010
- Fewest shots by both teams in a match: 36 - v Ivory Coast, 25 June 2010
- Most shots on target in a match: 4 - (2 times)
  - v Portugal, 21 June 2010
  - v Ivory Coast, 25 June 2010
- Fewest shots on target in a match: 3 - v Brazil, 15 June 2010
- Most shots on target by a opponent in a match: 15 - v Ivory Coast, 25 June 2010
- Fewest shots on target by a opponent in a match: 10 - v Brazil, 15 June 2010
- Most shots on target by both teams in a match: 19 - v Ivory Coast, 25 June 2010
- Fewest shots on target by both teams in a match: 13 - v Brazil, 15 June 2010
- Most corners in a match: 3 - v Brazil, 15 June 2010
- Fewest corners in a match: 0 - v Ivory Coast, 25 June 2010
- Most corners by a opponent in a match: 7 - (2 times)
  - v Brazil, 15 June 2010
  - v Ivory Coast, 25 June 2010
- Fewest corners by a opponent in a match: 5 - v Portugal, 21 June 2010
- Most corners by both teams in a match: 10 - v Brazil, 15 June 2010
- Fewest corners by both teams in a match: 6 - v Portugal, 21 June 2010
- Most offside in a match: 3 - v Portugal, 21 June 2010
- Most offside by a opponent in a match: 4 - v Ivory Coast, 25 June 2010
- Most offside by both teams in a match: 6 - v Ivory Coast, 25 June 2010
- Fewest offside by both teams in a match: 4 - v Brazil, 15 June 2010
- Most yellow cards in a match: 2 - v Portugal, 21 June 2010
- Most yellow cards by a opponent in a match: 2 - v Portugal, 21 June 2010
- Most yellow cards by both teams in a match: 4 - v Portugal, 21 June 2010
- Fewest yellow cards by both teams in a match: 0 - (3 times)
  - v Chile, 15 July 1966
  - v Italy, 19 July 1966
  - v Ivory Coast, 25 June 2010

== Competitive record ==
=== FIFA World Cup ===
FIFA World Cup record										Qualification record					
Year	Result	Position	Pld	W	D	L	GF	GA	Squad	Pld	W	D	L	GF	GA
(Uruguay) 1930	Part of Japan									Part of Japan					
(Italy) 1934	Part of Japan									Part of Japan					
(France) 1938	Part of Japan									Part of Japan					
(Brazil) 1950	Not a FIFA member									Not a FIFA member					
(Switzerland) 1954	Not a FIFA member									Not a FIFA member					
(Sweden) 1958	Not a FIFA member									Not a FIFA member					
(Chile) 1962	Did not enter									Did not enter					
(England) 1966	Quarter-finals	8th	4	1	1	2	5	9	Squad	2	2	0	0	9	2
(Mexico) 1970	Withdrew									Withdrew					
(West Germany) 1974	Did not qualify									6	1	3	2	5	5
(Argentina) 1978	Withdrew									Withdrew					
(Spain) 1982	Did not qualify									5	3	1	1	9	6
(Mexico) 1986	Did not qualify									4	1	2	1	3	2
(Italy) 1990	Did not qualify									11	5	2	4	13	9
(United States) 1994	Did not qualify									13	8	1	4	24	18
(France) 1998	Did not enter									Did not enter					
(South Korea) (Japan) 2002	Did not enter									Did not enter					
(Germany) 2006	Did not qualify									12	4	2	6	16	16
(South Africa) 2010	Group stage	32nd	3	0	0	3	1	12	Squad	16	8	6	2	20	7
(Brazil) 2014	Did not qualify									6	2	1	3	3	4
(Russia) 2018	Did not qualify									8	5	1	2	14	8
(Qatar) 2022	Withdrew									Withdrew					
(Canada) (Mexico) (United States) 2026	Did not qualify									16	3	3	10	20	28
(Morocco) (Portugal) (Spain) 2030	To be determined									To be determined					
(Saudi Arabia) 2034	To be determined									To be determined					
Total	Quarter-finals	2/17	7	1	1	5	6	21	—	99	42	22	35	136	105

List of FIFA World Cup matches
Year	Round	Score	Result
1966	Round 1	North Korea 0–3 Soviet Union	Loss
1966	Round 1	North Korea 1–1 Chile	Draw
1966	Round 1	North Korea 1–0 Italy	Win
1966	Round 2	North Korea 3–5 Portugal	Loss
2010	Round 1	North Korea 1–2 Brazil	Loss
2010	Round 1	North Korea 0–7 Portugal	Loss
2010	Round 1	North Korea 0–3 Ivory Coast	Loss

=== AFC Asian Cup ===
AFC Asian Cup record										Qualification record					
Year	Result	Position	Pld	W	D	L	GF	GA	Squad	Pld	W	D	L	GF	GA
(Hong Kong) 1956	Not an AFC member									Not an AFC member					
(South Korea) 1960	Not an AFC member									Not an AFC member					
(Israel) 1964	Not an AFC member									Not an AFC member					
(Iran) 1968	Not an AFC member									Not an AFC member					
(Thailand) 1972	Not an AFC member									Not an AFC member					
(Iran) 1976	Qualified but withdrew									5	3	1	1	7	4
(Kuwait) 1980	Fourth place	4th	6	3	0	3	10	12	Squad	5	4	1	0	9	2
(Singapore) 1984	Banned									Banned					
(Qatar) 1988	Did not qualify									4	2	1	1	3	2
(Japan) 1992	Group stage	8th	3	0	1	2	2	5	Squad	3	2	1	0	8	0
(United Arab Emirates) 1996	Did not enter									Did not enter					
(Lebanon) 2000	Did not qualify									6	3	2	1	11	7
(China) 2004	Did not qualify									8	1	2	5	5	15
(Indonesia) (Malaysia) (Thailand) (Vietnam) 2007	Banned									Banned					
(Qatar) 2011	Group stage	12th	3	0	1	2	0	2	Squad	AFC Challenge Cup					
(Australia) 2015	Group stage	14th	3	0	0	3	2	7	Squad	AFC Challenge Cup					
(United Arab Emirates) 2019	Group stage	24th	3	0	0	3	1	14	Squad	14	8	3	3	27	18
(Qatar) 2023	Withdrew									Withdrew during qualifying					
(Saudi Arabia) 2027	Qualified									6	3	0	3	11	7
Total	Fourth place	6/14	18	3	2	13	15	40	—	51	26	11	14	76	55

=== EAFF Championship ===
EAFF Championship record										Preliminary round					
Year	Result	Position	Pld	W	D	L	GF	GA	Squad	Pld	W	D	L	GF	GA
(Japan) 2003	Withdrew									Withdrew					
(South Korea) 2005	Third place	3rd	3	1	1	1	1	2	Squad	4	4	0	0	31	0
(China) 2008	Fourth place	4th	3	0	2	1	3	5	Squad	3	3	0	0	15	1
(Japan) 2010	Did not qualify									3	2	1	0	11	3
(South Korea) 2013	Did not qualify									4	3	1	0	16	2
(China) 2015	Third place	3rd	3	1	1	1	2	3	Squad	3	2	1	0	7	2
(Japan) 2017	Fourth place	4th	3	0	1	2	1	3	Squad	3	3	0	0	5	0
(South Korea) 2019	Did not qualify									3	2	1	0	6	1
(Japan) 2022	Did not participate									Not held					
(South Korea) 2025	Withdrew									Withdrew					
Total	Third place	4/10	12	2	5	5	7	13	—	23	19	4	0	91	9

=== Asian Games ===
Asian Games record
Year	Result	Position	Pld	W	D	L	GF	GA	Squad
1951 to 1970	Did not enter								
(Iran) 1974	Fourth place	4th	7	3	1	3	11	8	Squad
(Thailand) 1978	Gold medal	1st	6	4	2	0	12	3	Squad
(India) 1982	Fourth place	4th	6	2	2	2	9	8	Squad
(South Korea) 1986	Did not enter								
(China) 1990	Silver medal	2nd	5	1	3	1	2	2	Squad
(Japan) 1994	Did not enter								
(Thailand) 1998	Second round	13th	4	1	2	1	6	8	Squad
2002–present	See North Korea national under-23 football team								
Total	1 Gold medal	5/13	28	11	10	7	40	29	—

=== AFC Challenge Cup ===
AFC Challenge Cup record
Year	Result	Position	Pld	W	D	L	GF	GA
(Bangladesh) 2006	Did not enter							
(India) 2008	Third place	3rd	5	4	0	1	9	1
(Sri Lanka) 2010	Champions	1st	5	3	2	0	14	2
(Nepal) 2012	Champions	1st	5	5	0	0	12	1
(Maldives) 2014	Did not enter							
Total	2 Titles	3/5	15	12	2	1	35	4

=== Dynasty Cup ===
Dynasty Cup record
Year	Result	Position	Pld	W	D	L	GF	GA
(China) 1990	Third place	3rd	3	0	1	2	1	3
(China) 1992	Third place	3rd	3	0	2	1	4	7
(Hong Kong) 1995	Did not enter							
(Japan) 1998	Did not enter							
Total	Third place	2/4	6	0	3	3	5	10

== All-time results ==
The following table shows North Korea's all-time international record, correct as of 10 June 2025.

Total	Pld	W	D	L	GF	GA
Total	362	140	90	122	500	411

- worldfootball.net
- FIFA.com

== Honours ==
=== Continental ===
- AFC Challenge Cup
  - (gold) Champions: 2010, 2012
  - (bronze) Third place: 2008
- Asian Games^{1}
  - (gold) Gold medal: 1978
  - (silver) Silver medal: 1990

=== Regional ===
- EAFF East Asian Cup / EAFF E-1 Football Championship
  - (bronze) Third place: 2005, 2015

=== Friendly ===
- Nehru Cup: 1993
- AIFF Intercontinental Cup: 2019
- Qatar International Friendship Tournament: 2010
- VFF Vietnam International Friendly Cup: 2010
- King's Cup: 1986, 1987, 2002
- Four Nations Tournament: 2001

=== Summary ===
Only official honours are included, according to FIFA statutes (competitions organized/recognized by FIFA or an affiliated confederation).

Competition	1st place, gold medalist(s)	2nd place, silver medalist(s)	3rd place, bronze medalist(s)	Total
AFC Challenge Cup	2	0	1	3
Total	2	0	1	3

1. Competition organized by OCA, officially not recognized by FIFA.

== See also ==
- Football in North Korea
- North Korea–South Korea football rivalry
- The Game of Their Lives (2002 film)

Preceded by 1974 Iran	Asian Games Champions; 1978 (first title)	Succeeded by 1982 Iraq
Preceded by 2008 India	AFC Challenge Cup Champions; 2010 (first title); 2012 (second title)	Succeeded by 2014 Palestine
