= 1992 UEFA European Under-21 Championship =

Tournament details
- Dates: 11 September 1990 – 18 December 1991 (qualifications); 10 March – 3 June (finals)
- Teams: 32 (from 1 confederation)

Final positions
- Champions: Italy (1st title)
- Runners-up: Sweden

Tournament statistics
- Matches played: 111
- Goals scored: 296 (2.67 per match)
- Attendance: 128,567 (1,158 per match)
- Top scorer: (Italy) Renato Buso (3 goals)
- Best player: (Italy) Renato Buso

Men's European Qualifier
Tournament details
- Teams: 28 (from 1 confederation)

The 1992 UEFA European Under-21 Championship, which spanned two years (1990–92), had 32 entrants. Malta and Israel competed for the first time. This was also the first appearance of the unified Germany team since 1964. Italy U-21s won the competition.

The competition doubled as the European qualifying stage for the Olympic Football Tournament, which until 1992 existed as a separate tournament. Hosts Spain qualify automatically and the best four eligible nations would qualify automatically. The fifth best European team would play-off against the best Oceania (OFC) team for another Olympics place. Beside the hosting Spain, teams of Scotland, England, Luxembourg and San-Marino did not take part in Olympic qualifications (not members of IOC). Teams of Northern Ireland, Wales and Faroes Islands did not take part in this competition at all.

The 32 national teams were divided into eight groups (six groups of 4 + one group of 3 + one group of 5). The group winners played off against each other on a two-legged home-and-away basis until the winner was decided. There was no finals tournament or 3rd-place playoff.

== Qualifying stage ==
=== Draw ===
The allocation of teams into qualifying groups was based on that of UEFA Euro 1992 qualifying tournament with several changes, reflecting the absence of some nations:

- Groups 1 and 7 featured the same nations
- Group 2 did not include San Marino (moved to Group 4)
- Group 3 did not include Cyprus (moved to Group 8)
- Group 4 did not include Northern Ireland and Faroe Islands, but included San Marino (moved from Group 2)
- Group 5 did not include Wales
- Group 6 did not include Greece (moved to Group 8)
- Group 8 composed of Cyprus (moved from Group 3), Greece (moved from Group 7), Sweden and Israel (both of whom did not participate in senior Euro qualification)

Qualifying Group 1		P	W	D	L	F	A	Pts
**1**	**Czechoslovakia**	8	7	1	0	23	4	15
**2**	France	8	3	2	3	7	5	8
**3**	Spain	7	3	2	2	6	5	8
**4**	Albania	7	1	2	4	3	13	4
**5**	Iceland	8	1	1	6	3	15	3

- Iceland 0–0 Albania
- Iceland 0–1 France
- Czechoslovakia 7–0 Iceland
- Spain 2–0 Iceland
- France 1–2 Czechoslovakia
- Czechoslovakia 3–1 Spain
- Albania 0–0 France
- Spain 1–0 Albania
- France 0–1 Spain
- France 3–0 Albania
- Albania 1–5 Czechoslovakia
- Albania 2–1 Iceland
- Iceland 0–1 Czechoslovakia
- Czechoslovakia 1–0 France
- Iceland 1–0 Spain
- Spain 0–0 France
- Czechoslovakia 3–0 Albania
- Spain 1–1 Czechoslovakia
- France 2–1 Iceland
- Albania – Spain
  (Not played)

Qualifying Group 2		P	W	D	L	F	A	Pts
**1**	**Scotland**	6	5	0	1	13	5	10
**2**	Bulgaria	6	4	0	2	6	2	8
**3**	Romania	6	2	0	4	5	9	4
**4**	Switzerland	6	1	0	5	5	13	2

- Scotland 2–0 Romania
- Switzerland 0–2 Bulgaria
- Romania 0–1 Bulgaria
- Scotland 4–2 Switzerland
- Bulgaria 2–0 Scotland
- Scotland 1–0 Bulgaria
- Switzerland 0–2 Romania
- Bulgaria 1–0 Switzerland
- Switzerland 0–3 Scotland
- Romania 1–3 Scotland
- Romania 1–3 Switzerland
- Bulgaria 0–1 Romania

Qualifying Group 3		P	W	D	L	F	A	Pts
**1**	**Italy**	6	4	1	1	6	8	9
**2**	Norway	6	3	1	2	13	6	7
**3**	Soviet Union	6	2	3	1	6	4	7
**4**	Hungary	6	0	1	5	1	8	1

- USSR 2–2 Norway
- Norway 3–1 Hungary
- Italy 1–0 Hungary
- Hungary 0–0 USSR
- Hungary 0–1 Italy
- Norway 6–0 Italy
- Italy 1–0 USSR
- Norway 0–1 USSR
- USSR 2–0 Hungary
- USSR 1–1 Italy
- Hungary 0–1 Norway
- Italy 2–1 Norway

11 September 1990

Soviet Union	2–2	Norway
Onopko 15'; Bezhenar 81' (pen.)	Report	Strand 31'; Bohinen 71'

Central Stadium "Lokomotiv", Moscow
Attendance: 5,500
Referee: Eero Aho (Finland)
18 April 1991

Hungary	0–0	Soviet Union
	Report

Gyöngyös
Attendance: 800
Referee: Lube Spasov (Bulgaria)
12 June 1991

Italy	1–0	Soviet Union
Buso 68'	Report

Stadio Silvio Appiani, Padua
Attendance: 12,342
Referee: Jozef Marko (Czecho-Slovakia)
12 June 1991

Norway	0–1	Soviet Union
	Report	Tishkov 11'

Kristiansand Stadion, Kristiansand
Attendance: 7,800
Referee: David Magill (Northern Ireland)
24 September 1991

Soviet Union	2–0	Hungary
Scherbakov 56'; Radchenko 81'	Report

Central Stadium "Dinamo", Moscow
Attendance: 4,700
Referee: Ion Crăciunescu (Romania)
16 October 1991

Soviet Union	1–1	Italy
Shustikov 49'	Report (ru); Report (en)	Buso 59'

Republican Sports Complex "Lokomotiv", Simferopol
Attendance: 22,000
Referee: Anders Frisk (Sweden)

Qualifying Group 4		P	W	D	L	F	A	Pts
**1**	**Denmark**	6	4	2	0	21	4	10
**2**	Yugoslavia	6	4	0	2	11	10	8
**3**	Austria	6	2	2	2	8	5	6
**4**	San Marino	6	0	0	6	0	21	0

- San Marino 0–3 Denmark
- Yugoslavia 1–0 Austria
- Denmark 3–0 Yugoslavia
- San Marino 0–2 Austria
- Yugoslavia 5–0 San Marino
- Austria 3–0 San Marino
- Denmark 7–0 San Marino
- Yugoslavia 2–6 Denmark
- Denmark 1–1 Austria
- Austria 1–1 Denmark
- Austria 1–2 Yugoslavia
- San Marino 0–1 Yugoslavia

Qualifying Group 5		P	W	D	L	F	A	Pts
**1**	**Germany**	4	4	0	0	12	1	8
**2**	Belgium	4	2	0	2	5	6	4
**3**	Luxembourg	4	0	0	4	0	10	0

- Luxembourg 0–3 Germany
- Belgium 2–0 Luxembourg
- Germany 3–1 Belgium
- Luxembourg 0–2 Belgium
- Belgium 0–3 Germany
- Germany 3–0 Luxembourg

Qualifying Group 6		P	W	D	L	F	A	Pts
**1**	**Netherlands**	6	4	2	0	20	4	10
**2**	Portugal	6	4	2	0	9	2	10
**3**	Finland	6	2	0	4	7	13	4
**4**	Malta	6	0	0	6	5	22	0

- Finland 0–1 Portugal
- Portugal 0–0 Netherlands
- Malta 1–4 Netherlands
- Malta 1–3 Portugal
- Portugal 2–0 Malta
- Netherlands 7–1 Malta
- Netherlands 1–0 Finland
- Finland 1–7 Netherlands
- Finland 3–1 Malta
- Portugal 2–0 Finland
- Netherlands 1–1 Portugal
- Malta 1–3 Finland

Qualifying Group 7		P	W	D	L	F	A	Pts
**1**	**Poland**	6	6	0	0	10	2	12
**2**	England	6	3	1	2	11	5	7
**3**	Turkey	6	1	1	4	6	11	3
**4**	Republic of Ireland	6	1	0	5	5	14	2

- England 0–1 Poland
- Ireland 3–2 Turkey
- Ireland 0–3 England
- Turkey 0–1 Poland
- England 3–0 Ireland
- Poland 2–0 Turkey
- Ireland 1–2 Poland
- Turkey 2–2 England
- England 2–0 Turkey
- Poland 2–0 Ireland
- Poland 2–1 England
- Turkey 2–1 Ireland

Qualifying Group 8		P	W	D	L	F	A	Pts
**1**	**Sweden**	6	4	2	0	17	3	10
**2**	Israel	6	3	2	1	11	6	8
**3**	Greece	6	1	1	4	6	13	3
**4**	Cyprus	6	1	1	4	3	15	3

- Sweden 5–0 Greece
- Cyprus 1–1 Sweden
- Greece 2–2 Israel
- Israel 4–0 Cyprus
- Cyprus 1–0 Greece
- Sweden 6–0 Cyprus
- Sweden 2–1 Israel
- Israel 2–1 Greece
- Israel 0–0 Sweden
- Greece 1–3 Sweden
- Cyprus 1–2 Israel
- Greece 2–0 Cyprus

=== Qualified teams ===
Country	Qualified as	Previous appearances in tournament^{1}
Czechoslovakia	Group 1 winner	4 (1978, 1980, 1988, 1990)
Scotland	Group 2 winner	3 (1980, 1982, 1984, 1988)
Italy	Group 3 winner	7 (1978, 1980, 1982, 1984, 1986, 1988, 1990)
Denmark	Group 4 winner	2 (1978, 1986)
Germany	Group 5 winner	2 (1982, 1990)
Netherlands	Group 6 winner	1 (1988)
Poland	Group 7 winner	3 (1982, 1984, 1986)
Sweden	Group 8 winner	2 (1986, 1990)

^{1} Bold indicates champion for that year

== Squads ==
1992 UEFA European Under-21 Championship squads

Only players born on or after 1 January 1969 were eligible to play in the tournament.

== Knockout stages ==
Quarterfinals
Germany	1	3	4
Scotland	1	4	5
Netherlands	2	0	2
Sweden	1	1	2
Denmark	5	1	6
Poland	0	1	1
Czechoslovakia	1	0	1
Italy	2	2	4

Semifinals
Scotland	0	0	0
Sweden	0	1	1
Denmark	0	0	0
Italy	1	2	3

Final
Sweden	0	1	1
Italy	2	0	2

=== Quarter-finals ===
==== First leg ====
10 March 1992

Germany	1–1	Scotland
Schmäler 39'	Report	Creaney 31'

Ruhrstadion, Bochum
Attendance: 8,000
Referee: Arcangelo Pezzella (Italy)

11 March 1992

Netherlands	2–1	Sweden
Roest 22' (pen.); Taument 54'	Report	Fursth 24'

Nieuw Galgenwaard, Utrecht
Attendance: 8,500
Referee: Keith Burge (Wales)

11 March 1992

Denmark	5–0	Poland
Frandsen 10'; Molnar 22', 17'; Møller 24', 42'	Report

Aalborg Stadion, Aalborg
Attendance: 4,367
Referee: Wolf-Günter Wiesel (Germany)

11 March 1992

Czechoslovakia	1–2	Italy
Nečas 86' (pen.)	Report	Melli 9'; Kotůlek 55' (o.g.)

Spartak Stadium, Trnava
Attendance: 3,465
Referee: Lajos Hartmann (Hungary)

==== Second leg ====
23 March 1992

Scotland	4–3	Germany
McKinnon 43'; Creaney 69'; Lambert 78'; Rae 87'	Report	Kranz 10'; Scholl 41'; Herrlich 53'

Pittodrie Stadium, Aberdeen
Attendance: 20,175
Referee: Joaquín Urío Velázquez (Spain)

25 March 1992

Sweden	1–0	Netherlands
Simpson 75'	Report

Värendsvallen, Växjö
Attendance: 7,353
Referee: Brian Hill (England)

25 March 1992

Poland	1–1	Denmark
Juskowiak 71'	Report	Frank 29'

Stadion Górnika, Zabrze
Attendance: 3,000
Referee: Egil Nervik (Norway)

25 March 1992

Italy	2–0	Czechoslovakia
Bertarelli 39'; Luzardi 42'	Report

Stadio Silvio Appiani, Padua
Attendance: 12,562
Referee: Mircea Salomir (Romania)

=== Semi-finals ===
==== First leg ====
9 April 1992

Denmark	0–1	Italy
	Report	Buso 20'

Aalborg Stadion, Aalborg
Attendance: 4,400
Referee: Joël Quiniou (France)

22 April 1992

Scotland	0–0	Sweden
	Report

Pittodrie Stadium, Aberdeen
Attendance: 21,482
Referee: Michał Listkiewicz (Poland)

==== Second leg ====
22 April 1992

Italy	2–0	Denmark
Buso 54'; Muzzi 79'	Report

Renato Curi, Perugia
Attendance: 10,869
Referee: Luben Spasov (Bulgaria)

29 April 1992

Sweden	1–0	Scotland
Rödlund 81'	Report

Eyravallen, Örebro
Attendance: 2,376
Referee: Jozef Marko (Czechoslovakia)

=== Final ===
==== First leg ====
28 May 1992

Italy	2–0	Sweden
Buso 71'; Sordo 80'	Report

Paolo Mazza, Ferrara
Attendance: 15,846
Referee: Mario van der Ende (Netherlands)

==== Second leg ====
3 June 1992

Sweden	1–0	Italy
Simpson 60'	Report

Värendsvallen, Växjö
Attendance: 6,172
Referee: Brian McGinlay (Scotland)

== Goalscorers ==
3 goals

- (Italy) Renato Buso

2 goals

- (Denmark) Peter Møller
- (Denmark) Miklos Molnar
- (Scotland) Gerry Creaney
- (Sweden) Pascal Simpson

1 goal

- (Czechoslovakia) Radim Nečas
- (Denmark) Per Frandsen
- (Denmark) Peter Frank
- (Germany) Heiko Herrlich
- (Germany) Markus Kranz
- (Germany) Nils Schmäler
- (Germany) Mehmet Scholl
- (Italy) Mauro Bertarelli
- (Italy) Luca Luzardi
- (Italy) Alessandro Melli
- (Italy) Roberto Muzzi
- (Italy) Gianluca Sordo
- (Netherlands) Robert Roest
- (Netherlands) Gaston Taument
- (Poland) Andrzej Juskowiak
- (Scotland) Paul Lambert
- (Scotland) Ray McKinnon
- (Scotland) Alex Rae
- (Sweden) Christer Fursth
- (Sweden) Jonny Rödlund

Own goal

- (Czechoslovakia) Martin Kotůlek (playing against Italy)

== Medal table and Olympic qualifiers ==
=== 1992 UEFA European under-21 championship medal table ===
Pos	Team	Pld	W	D	L	GF	GA	GD	Pts	Final result
1st place, gold medalist(s)	Italy	6	5	0	1	9	2	+7	10	Gold Medal
2nd place, silver medalist(s)	Sweden	6	3	1	2	4	4	0	7	Silver Medal
3rd place, bronze medalist(s)	Scotland	4	1	2	1	5	5	0	4	Eliminated in semi-finals
3rd place, bronze medalist(s)	Denmark	4	1	1	2	6	4	+2	3	Eliminated in semi-finals
5	Netherlands	2	1	0	1	2	2	0	2	Eliminated in quarter-finals
6	Germany	2	0	1	1	4	5	−1	1	Eliminated in quarter-finals
7	Poland	2	0	1	1	1	6	−5	1	Eliminated in quarter-finals
8	Czech Republic	2	0	0	2	1	4	−3	0	Eliminated in quarter-finals

Source: [ ]

=== Olympic qualifiers ===
- Denmark, Italy and Sweden as winners of their quarter-final rounds qualify for Olympic Games finals. Since the fourth winner Scotland do not compete in the Olympic Football Tournament (See Great Britain Olympic football team), Poland qualifies instead, being the best of the four quarter-final losers according to a special coefficient which is calculated based on the points achieved in the group stage and the quarter-finals, divided by the number of games played. Poland's coefficient is 1.625, while the Netherlands, Czechoslovakia and Germany have achieved a score of 1.5. The Netherlands having the best goal differential is the one of these three teams to face OFC champions in playoff for an additional place.
1. Poland - 13 points/8 games played = 1.625
2. Netherlands - 12 points/8 games played = 1.5 (+ goals: 22/6 = 3.67)
3. Czechoslovakia - 15 points/10 games played = 1.5 (+ goals: 24/8 = 3.0)
4. Germany - 9 points/6 games played = 1.5 (+ goals: 16/6 = 2.67)

==== OFC–UEFA play-off ====
Team 1	Agg.	Team 2	1st leg	2nd leg
Australia	3–3 (a)	Netherlands	1–1	2–2 (a.e.t.)
