= Football at the 1992 Summer Olympics – Men's qualification (OFC–UEFA play-off) =

1992 Olympic Football Tournament qualification (OFC–UEFA play-off)
- Event: Football at the 1992 Summer Olympics – Men's qualification
Australia	Netherlands
(Australia)	(Netherlands)
3	3
- on aggregate Australia won on away goals

First leg
Australia	Netherlands
1	1
- Date: 17 May 1992
- Venue: Sydney Football Stadium, Sydney
- Referee: Shizuo Takada (Japan)
- Attendance: 18,784

Second leg
Netherlands	Australia
2	2
- After extra time
- Date: 24 May 1992
- Venue: Stadion Galgenwaard, Utrecht
- Referee: Philippe Leduc (France)
- Attendance: 8,500

The OFC–UEFA play-off of the 1992 Olympic Football Tournament qualification competition was a two-legged tie that decided one spot in the 1992 Olympic football tournament in Spain. The play-off was contested by the winners from the OFC, Australia, and the fourth-ranked team from UEFA, the Netherlands.

The first leg in Sydney finished as a 1–1 draw, while the second leg in Utrecht finished as a 2–2 draw after extra time. Though level 3–3 on aggregate, Australia won on away goals and qualified for the 1992 Summer Olympics.

== Qualified teams ==
Confederation	Placement	Team
OFC	1991 OFC Men's Olympic Qualifying Tournament winners	Australia
UEFA	1992 UEFA European Under-21 Championship fourth-ranked team	Netherlands

== Summary ==
Team 1	Agg.	Team 2	1st leg	2nd leg
Australia	3–3 (a)	Netherlands	1–1	2–2 (a.e.t.)

== Matches ==
17 May 1992

Australia	1–1	Netherlands
Vidmar 24'	Report	Murphy 49' (o.g.)

Sydney Football Stadium, Sydney
Attendance: 18,784
Referee: Shizuo Takada (Japan)
24 May 1992

Netherlands	2–2 (a.e.t.)	Australia
De Boer 69'; Numan 102'	Report	Zelic 43', 117'

Stadion Galgenwaard, Utrecht
Attendance: 8,500
Referee: Philippe Leduc (France)

3–3 on aggregate. Australia won on away goals and qualified for the 1992 Summer Olympics.

== Goalscorers ==
There were 6 goals scored in 2 matches, for an average of 3 goals per match.

2 goals

- (Australia) Ned Zelic

1 goal

- (Australia) Tony Vidmar
- (Netherlands) Ronald de Boer
- (Netherlands) Arthur Numan

1 own goal

- (Australia) Shaun Murphy (against Netherlands)
