= Luca Luzardi =

Italian footballer

Personal information
- Date of birth: 18 February 1970 (age 56)
- Place of birth: Manerbio, Italy
- Height: 1.85 m (6 ft 1 in)
- Position: Defender

Senior career*
Years	Team	Apps	(Gls)
1987–1992	Brescia	104	(3)
1988–1989	→ Prato (loan)	33	(2)
1992–1994	Lazio	39	(1)
1994–1995	Napoli	5	(0)
1995–1997	Brescia	37	(0)
1997–2000	Ascoli	50	(0)
2000–2001	Reggiana	19	(0)
2001–2002	Viareggio	22	(0)
2002–2003	Lodigiani	25	(1)
2004–2005	Monterotondo	25	(0)
- * Club domestic league appearances and goals

Luca Luzardi (born 18 February 1970) is an Italian former professional footballer who played as a defender.

== Club career ==
Luzardi was born in Manerbio. After playing for several Italian clubs, such as Brescia, Prato, Lazio, and Napoli in 1996, Luzardi joined Tottenham Hotspur on a six-week trial from Brescia, but was only allowed to play in friendly matches. Gerry Francis, the Spurs manager at the time, ultimately decided not to meet his £600,000 valuation, and Luzardi returned to Italy.

== International career ==
At international level, Luzardi was a member of the Italy national under-21 football team that won the 1992 UEFA European Under-21 Football Championship; he also represented Italy at the 1992 Summer Olympics.

== Honours ==
=== International ===
Italy U-21

- 1992 UEFA European Under-21 Football Championship winner.
