= Kim Chang-bok =

North Korean footballer (born 1959)

Personal information
- Date of birth: 14 October 1959 (age 67)
- Place of birth: North Korea

Managerial career
- Years: Team
- 2015–2016: North Korea

- Kim Chang-bok
- Hangul: 김창복
- RR: Gim Changbok
- MR: Kim Ch'angbok

Kim Chang-bok (Korean: 김창복; born October 14, 1959) is a North Korean football coach who managed the North Korea national football team from 2015 to 2016. He replaced Jo Tong-sop in the role after the 2015 AFC Asian Cup. Kim was replaced a year later by Jørn Andersen.

In January 2016, he was named number 9 of North Korea's ten best coaches (across all sports) of 2015.
