= Ch'oeusu =

North Korean sporting goods manufacturer

- Native name: 최우수
- Romanized name: Ch'oeusu
- Industry: Manufacture
- Headquarters: North Korea
- Key people: Choe Jong-chun
- Products: Sports equipment
- Owner: Ministry of Physical Culture and Sports

Ch'oeusu (Korean: 최우수) is a North Korean sporting goods manufacturing unit. It operates under the authority of the Ministry of Physical Culture and Sports and was the official kit provider for the North Korea national football team from 2014 to 2024. Choeusu also produces footballs, volleyballs and goal-netting, among others.
