= Djair (footballer, born 1971) =

Brazilian footballer

Personal information
- Full name: Djair Kaye de Brito
- Date of birth: 21 September 1971 (age 55)
- Place of birth: Rio de Janeiro, Brazil
- Position: Midfielder

Senior career*
Years	Team	Apps	(Gls)
1990–1991	Botafogo		
1991–1992	St. Gallen		
1992–1993	Lazio		
1993	Internacional		
1994	Fluminense		
1995	Flamengo		
1996	São Paulo		
1997	Botafogo		
1998–1999	Cruzeiro		
2000	Corinthians		
2001–2002	Atlético Mineiro		
2003	Fluminense		
2004	Madureira		
2004–2005	Al-Hilal		
2005–2006	Madureira		
2006	Bangu		
2007	Madureira		
2007	Estácio de Sá		
2007	Ituano		
2008	Duque de Caxias		

International career
1999	Brazil	2	(0)

Managerial career
- 2018: Madureira U20
- 2018: Madureira
- * Club domestic league appearances and goals

Djair Kaye de Brito (born 21 September 1971) is a Brazilian international footballer nicknamed Djair.

He has spent the majority of his career in Brazil (playing for Botafogo, Internacional, Fluminense, Flamengo, São Paulo, Cruzeiro, Corinthians, Atlético Mineiro, Madureira and Ituano), with brief stints in Switzerland (with St. Gallen), Italy (with Lazio) and Qatar (with Al-Kharitiyath). He won two caps for the national side, without scoring any goals.
