= Kim Yong-su =

Kim Yong-su may refer to

- Kim Yong-soo (born 1960), South Korean baseball player
- Kim Yong-su (footballer) (born 1979), North Korean association football midfielder
- Kim Yong-su (politician), North Korean politician
- Kim Yong-su (weightlifter) (born 1965), North Korean weightlifter
