= Football at the 1992 Summer Olympics – Men's qualification =

The qualification for football tournament at the 1992 Summer Olympics, all players should be under 23 years old.

== Qualified teams ==
The final tournament had 16 spots.

- Europe: 4.5 places, contested by 33 teams.
- South America: 2 places, contested by 10 teams.
- North and Central America: 2 places, contested by 25 teams.
- Africa: 3 places, contested by 24 teams.
- Asia: 3 places, contested by 28 teams.
- Oceania: 0.5 places, contested by 4 teams.

The following 16 teams qualified for the 1992 Olympic men's football tournament:

| Means of qualification | Berths | Qualified |
|---|---|---|
| Host nation | 1 | Spain |
| AFC Preliminary Competition | 3 | Qatar; South Korea; Kuwait |
| CAF Preliminary Competition | 3 | Egypt; Ghana; Morocco |
| 1992 CONCACAF Pre-Olympic Tournament | 2 | Mexico; United States |
| 1992 CONMEBOL Pre-Olympic Tournament | 2 | Colombia; Paraguay |
| OFC–UEFA play-off | 1 | Australia |
| 1992 UEFA European Under-21 Football Championship | 4 | Italy; Sweden; Denmark; Poland |
| Total | 16 | |

== Qualifications ==
=== Oceania ===
First six matches played in Australia, other six matches played in Fiji.

| Team | Pld | W | D | L | GF | GA | GD | Pts |
|---|---|---|---|---|---|---|---|---|
| Australia | 6 | 6 | 0 | 0 | 23 | 1 | +22 | 12 |
| New Zealand | 6 | 3 | 1 | 2 | 12 | 7 | +5 | 7 |
| Fiji | 6 | 1 | 2 | 3 | 3 | 15 | -12 | 4 |
| Papua New Guinea | 6 | 0 | 1 | 5 | 4 | 19 | -15 | 1 |

Australia advanced to the International Play-off.

=== OFC–UEFA play-off ===
| Team 1 | Agg. | Team 2 | 1st leg | 2nd leg |
|---|---|---|---|---|
| Australia | 3–3 (a) | Netherlands | 1–1 | 2–2 (a.e.t.) |
