= Kim Kwang-hyok =

Kim Kwang-hyok may refer to:

- Kim Kwang-hyok (athlete)
- Kim Kwang-hyok (politician)
