= Christer Fursth =

Swedish footballer

Personal information
- Full name: Karl Christer Fursth
- Date of birth: 6 July 1970 (age 56)
- Place of birth: Örebro, Sweden
- Height: 1.82 m (6 ft 0 in)
- Position: Midfielder

Senior career*
Years	Team	Apps	(Gls)
1988–1994	Örebro SK	196	(14)
1994–1996	Helsingborgs IF	51	(7)
1996–1998	1. FC Köln	4	(0)
1998–2003	Hammarby IF	120	(6)
Total		371	(27)

International career
1988	Sweden U19	1	(0)
1990–1992	Sweden U21/O	21	(4)
1992–1995	Sweden	4	(0)
- * Club domestic league appearances and goals

Karl Christer Fursth (born 6 July 1970) is a Swedish former professional footballer who played as a left midfielder.

He represented Örebro SK, Helsingborgs IF, 1. FC Köln, and Hammarby IF during a career that spanned between 1988 and 2003. A full international between 1992 and 1995, he won four caps for the Sweden national team. He also represented the Sweden Olympic team at the 1992 Summer Olympics in Barcelona, Spain.

== Career statistics ==
=== International ===
Appearances and goals by national team and year
National team	Year	Apps	Goals
Sweden	1992	3	0
Sweden	1993	0	0
Sweden	1994	0	0
Sweden	1995	1	0
Total		4	0

== Honours ==
Hammarby IF

- Allsvenskan: 2001
