= Robert Roest =

Dutch footballer (born 1969)

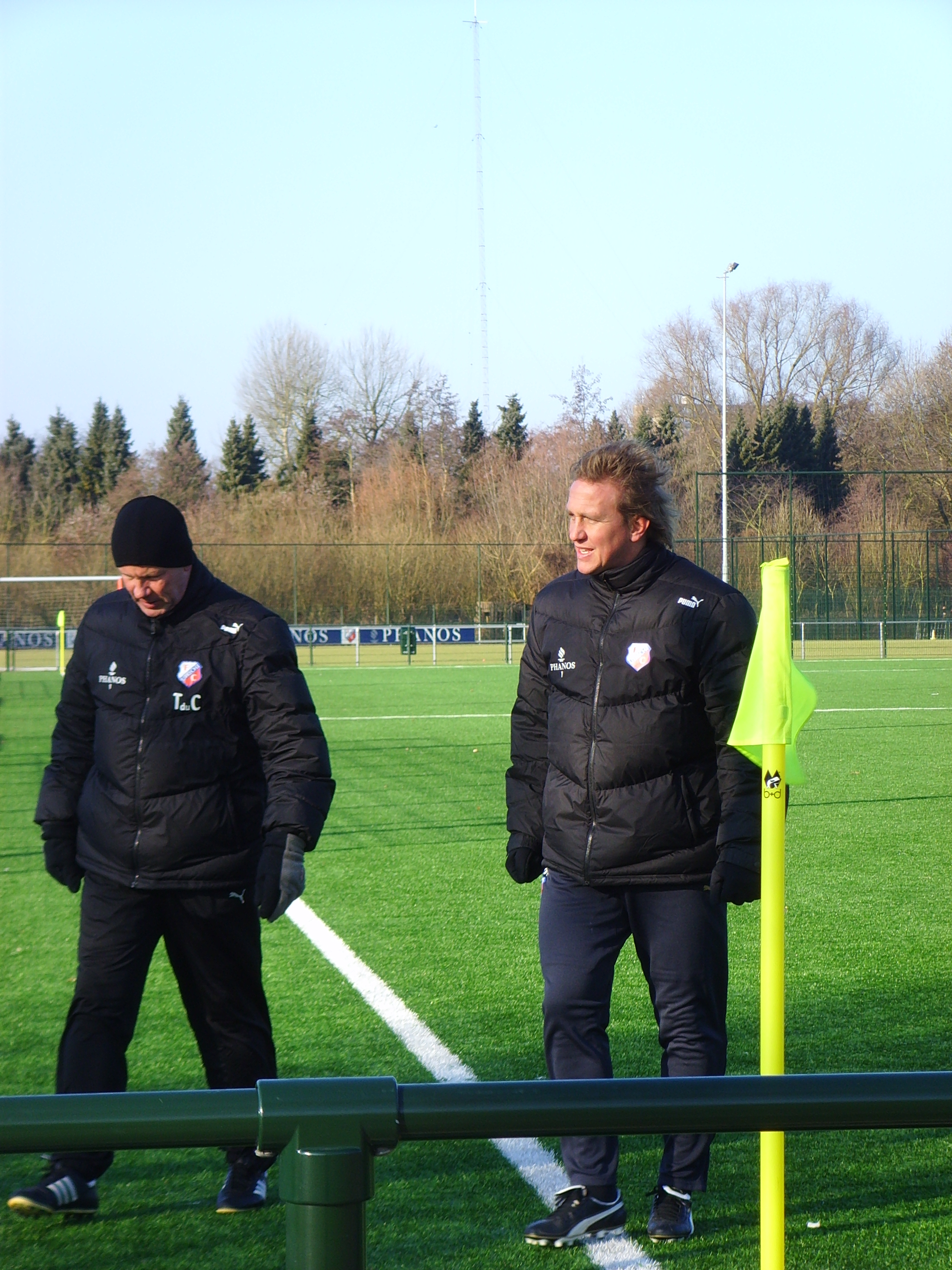
- Roest (right) with Ton du Chatinier, in 2009

Personal information
- Date of birth: 30 October 1969 (age 57)
- Place of birth: Soest, Netherlands
- Position: Defender

Team information
- Current team: H.C. & F.C. VICTORIA 1893 (manager)

Youth career
- –1988: FC Utrecht

Senior career*
| Years | Team | Apps | (Gls) |
| 1988–1994 | FC Utrecht | 140 | (13) |
| 1994–1995 | KSK Beveren | | |
| 1995–2001 | Fortuna Sittard | 187 | (16) |
| 2001–2003 | FC Utrecht | 35 | (1) |
| 2003–2006 | AGOVV Apeldoorn | 36 | (3) |

Managerial career
- 2009–2014: FC Utrecht (youth manager)
- 2014–: VV De Meern
- * Club domestic league appearances and goals as of 2 September 2016

Robert Roest (born 30 October 1969) is a Dutch footballer who played as a defender for FC Utrecht, KSK Beveren, Fortuna Sittard and AGOVV Apeldoorn.
