= Peter Frank (footballer) =

Danish footballer (born 1970)

Personal information
- Full name: Peter Frank Andersen
- Date of birth: 26 May 1970 (age 56)
- Place of birth: Rødovre, Denmark
- Position: Defender

Senior career*
Years	Team	Apps	(Gls)
1988–1989	BK Frem		
1989–1990	KB		
1990–1992	BK Frem		
1992–1995	Lyngby FC		
1995–1998	Herfølge BK		
1998–1999	RC Strasbourg		
1999–2000	AB		
2000–2001	Herfølge BK		

International career
1990–1992	Denmark U-21	16	(2)
- * Club domestic league appearances and goals

Peter Frank Andersen (born 26 May 1970) is a Danish former football player.

== External links and references ==
- Peter Frank national team profile at the Danish Football Association (in Danish)
- Peter Frank Andersen at racingstub.com
