= 2015 AFC Asian Cup Group B =

Football tournament group stage

Group B of the 2015 AFC Asian Cup was one of four groups of nations competing at the 2015 AFC Asian Cup. The group's first round of matches were played on 10 January, the second round on 14 January, and the final round on 18 January. All six group matches were played at venues in Australia. The group consisted of Uzbekistan, Saudi Arabia, China and North Korea. China and Uzbekistan advanced as group winners and runners-up respectively, while Saudi Arabia and North Korea were eliminated.

== Teams ==
| Draw position | Team | Method of qualification | Date of qualification | Finals appearance | Last appearance | Previous best performance | FIFA Rankings | |
| Draw position | Team | Method of qualification | Date of qualification | Finals appearance | Last appearance | Previous best performance | March 2014 (Note: The rankings of March 2014 were used for seeding for the final draw.) | Start of event |
|---|---|---|---|---|---|---|---|---|
| B1 | Uzbekistan | Group E runners-up | 19 November 2013 | 6th | 2011 | Fourth place (2011) | 55 | 71 |
| B2 | Saudi Arabia | Group C winners | 15 November 2013 | 9th | 2011 | Winners (1984, 1988, 1996) | 75 | 102 |
| B3 | China | Best third-placed team | 5 March 2014 | 11th | 2011 | Runners-up (1984, 2004) | 98 | 96 |
| B4 | North Korea | 2012 AFC Challenge Cup winners | 19 March 2012 | 4th | 2011 | Fourth place (1980) | 133 | 150 |

== Standings ==
| Pos | Team | Pld | W | D | L | GF | GA | GD | Pts | Qualification |
|---|---|---|---|---|---|---|---|---|---|---|
| 1 | China | 3 | 3 | 0 | 0 | 5 | 2 | +3 | 9 | Advance to knockout stage |
| 2 | Uzbekistan | 3 | 2 | 0 | 1 | 5 | 3 | +2 | 6 | Advance to knockout stage |
| 3 | Saudi Arabia | 3 | 1 | 0 | 2 | 5 | 5 | 0 | 3 | |
| 4 | North Korea | 3 | 0 | 0 | 3 | 2 | 7 | −5 | 0 | |

Source: Asian Cup Australia 2015
Rules for classification: Tiebreakers

In the quarter-finals:

- China PR advanced to play Australia (runner-up of Group A).
- Uzbekistan advanced to play South Korea (winner of Group A).

== Matches ==
=== Uzbekistan vs North Korea ===
Igor Sergeev netted with a fine header just after the hour mark to secure all three points for Mirjalol Qosimov's side as they look to build on their semi-final finish in Qatar in 2011. Uzbekistan controlled large swathes of the game, but were unable to make their dominance tell until Sergeev nodded in Server Djeparov's cross from the left.

Odil Ahmedov had a chance early on through a long-range shot that went woefully wide, before Timur Kapadze's deflected header came off the post. Rain began to fall in the second half, which created difficulties for both teams. Then, Sanzhar Tursunov aimed a dangerous free kick at the North Korean goal with 10 minutes remaining, while another attempt of his was saved by Ri Myong-guk seven minutes later. Uzbekistan were almost made to pay for it when Pak Kwang-ryong made a powerful header, but Ignatiy Nesterov's stop ensured that the Central Asian representative held on to the win.

10 January 2015
18:00 AEDT (UTC+11)

| Uzbekistan | 1–0 | North Korea |
|---|---|---|
| Sergeev 62' | Report |

Stadium Australia, Sydney
Attendance: 12,078
Referee: Nawaf Shukralla (Bahrain)

| Uzbekistan | North Korea |

| GK | 12 | Ignatiy Nesterov |
| CB | 3 | Shavkat Mullajanov |
| CB | 7 | Azizbek Haydarov |
| CB | 5 | Anzur Ismailov |
| RM | 23 | Akmal Shorakhmedov | (yellow card) 86' |
| CM | 18 | Timur Kapadze |
| CM | 9 | Odil Ahmedov | | (substituted off) 72' |
| LM | 19 | Vitaliy Denisov |
| AM | 17 | Sanzhar Tursunov | | (substituted off) 90+2' |
| AM | 8 | Server Djeparov (c) |
| CF | 11 | Igor Sergeev | | (substituted off) 88' |
Substitutions:
| FW | 4 | Sardor Rashidov | | (substituted on) 72' |
| FW | 6 | Bahodir Nasimov | | (substituted on) 88' |
| MF | 10 | Jamshid Iskanderov | | (substituted on) 90+2' |
Manager:
Mirjalol Qosimov

| GK | 1 | Ri Myong-guk |
| RB | 16 | Cha Jong-hyok |
| CB | 15 | Jang Kuk-chol |
| CB | 3 | Jang Song-hyok |
| LB | 4 | Jon Kwang-ik |
| DM | 19 | Ri Yong-jik | (yellow card) 79' |
| CM | 9 | Pak Song-chol (c) |
| CM | 8 | Ryang Yong-gi |
| RW | 11 | Jong Il-gwan |
| LW | 17 | So Hyon-uk | | (substituted off) 65' |
| CF | 10 | Pak Kwang-ryong |
Substitutions:
| FW | 12 | Om Chol-song | | (substituted on) 65' |
Manager:
Jo Tong-sop

Man of the Match:

- Igor Sergeev (Uzbekistan)

Assistant referees:

- Yaser Tulefat (Bahrain)
- Ebrahim Saleh (Bahrain)

Fourth official:

- Ammar Al-Jeneibi (United Arab Emirates)

Fifth official:

- Azman Ismail (Malaysia)

=== Saudi Arabia vs China ===
A late and somewhat fortunate free kick by Yu Hai proved to be the lone goal of the match as Saudi Arabia paid the price for Naif Hazazi's missed second-half penalty against Alain Perrin's side. Both China, who are looking to return to the quarter-finals for the first time since hosting the competition in 2004, and Saudi Arabia failed to qualify for the knockout phase at last edition. Three-time champions Saudi Arabia enjoyed the better moments early on with their technique-oriented game, seeing more time on the ball and pushing China deep into their own half. However, they failed to translate possession into opportunities and could not produce a single shot on target before the intermission.

The second half opened gingerly before Saudi Arabia kicked it into a higher gear on the hour mark, Hazazi breaking free down the inside left channel to win a penalty off defender Ren Hang who tackled one step too late. Ren, nevertheless, was bailed out by his keeper Wang Dalei who read Hazazi well from the spot, diving to his left to deny the Saudis the lead as the Chinese half of the crowd at Brisbane Stadium erupted in joy.

China nearly stung Saudi Arabia right away at the opposite end, Ren forcing a two-handed stop from Waleed Abdullah with a close-range header towards the bottom right corner of the net. The deadlock was finally broken after 80 minutes when Yu's free kick took a wicked deflection off a defender to the wrong-footed Abdullah who, despite a desperate attempt to keep Yu's effort out, saw the ball skip into his net.

10 January 2015
19:00 AEST (UTC+10)

| Saudi Arabia | 0–1 | China |
|---|---|---|
| | Report | Yu Hai 81' |

Brisbane Stadium, Brisbane
Attendance: 12,557
Referee: Alireza Faghani (Iran)

| Saudi Arabia | China |

| GK | 1 | Waleed Abdullah |
| RB | 2 | Saeed Al-Muwallad | (yellow card) 68' | (substituted off) 89' |
| CB | 3 | Osama Hawsawi |
| CB | 5 | Omar Hawsawi |
| LB | 13 | Yasser Al-Shahrani |
| CM | 14 | Saud Kariri (c) |
| CM | 7 | Salman Al-Faraj | (yellow card) 36' |
| RW | 6 | Mustafa Al-Bassas | (yellow card) 71' | (substituted off) 84' |
| AM | 20 | Nawaf Al Abed |
| LW | 18 | Salem Al-Dawsari |
| CF | 9 | Naif Hazazi |
Substitutions:
| FW | 10 | Mohammad Al-Sahlawi | | (substituted on) 84' |
| MF | 8 | Yahya Al-Shehri | | (substituted on) 89' |
Manager:
(Romania) Cosmin Olăroiu

| GK | 23 | Wang Dalei |
| RB | 5 | Zhang Linpeng |
| CB | 3 | Mei Fang | | (substituted off) 79' |
| CB | 2 | Ren Hang | (yellow card) 60' |
| LB | 10 | Zheng Zhi (c) | (yellow card) 34' |
| RM | 14 | Ji Xiang | (yellow card) 57' |
| CM | 15 | Wu Xi |
| CM | 11 | Hao Junmin | | (substituted off) 69' |
| LM | 21 | Yu Hai |
| CF | 17 | Zhang Chengdong | | (substituted off) 69' |
| CF | 7 | Wu Lei |
Substitutions:
| FW | 9 | Yang Xu | | (substituted on) 69' |
| MF | 20 | Yu Hanchao | | (substituted on) 69' |
| DF | 4 | Jiang Zhipeng | | (substituted on) 79' |
Manager:
(France) Alain Perrin

Man of the Match:

- Wang Dalei (China)

Assistant referees:

- Reza Sokhandan (Iran)
- Mohammadreza Abolfazli (Iran)

Fourth official:

- Muhammad Taqi Al-Jaafari (Singapore)

Fifth official:

- Jeffrey Goh Gek Pheng (Singapore)

=== North Korea vs Saudi Arabia ===
Mohammad Al-Sahlawi scored twice in quick succession just after half-time as three-time winners Saudi Arabia kept their quarter-final hopes alive after recording a 4–1 comeback win over North Korea on Wednesday. North Korea's first AFC Asian Cup goal since November 1992 scored after 11 minutes from Ryang Yong-gi had given Jo Tong-sop's side hope of bouncing back from their opening defeat by Uzbekistan in Group B. But after Naif Hazazi equalised for Saudi Arabia before half-time, Al Sahlawi's quick-fire double in the space of three second-half minutes and a late strike from Nawaf Al-Abed ensured Cosmin Olăroiu's side their first three points of the campaign having lost to China PR at the weekend and ended the quarter-final hopes of former semi-finalists North Korea. With both sides seeking their first points of the campaign at Melbourne Rectangular Stadium, North Korea made an aggressive start as Sim Hyon-jin was denied twice in quick succession by Waleed Abdullah, with the first from a dipping strike from the edge of the penalty area in the seventh minute and the second a glancing header from the resulting corner.

Abdullah, though, was beaten just four minutes later as Ryang followed up after the Saudi Arabia custodian could only parry Pak Kwang-ryong's dipping angled volley from Jong Il-gwan's knockdown back out towards the penalty spot. Saudi Arabia looked for an instant response as Hazazi headed agonisingly wide from inside the penalty area six minutes later as Ri Myong-guk's goal came under increasing pressure as the half progressed. And Saudi Arabia equalised eight minutes before half-time as the Green Falcons quickly worked the ball across the edge of the penalty area for Al Abed to tee-up Hazazi, who fired low through the legs of Ri Myong-guk at his near post. The goalkeeper did come to North Korea's rescue three minutes before half-time as the custodian produced a superb one-handed save low to his left to turn Al Abed's equally eye-catching turn and volley around the post.

But as Saudi Arabia continued to dominate into the second half, Ri Myong-guk was again beaten seven minutes after half-time as Al Sahlawi was on hand to stab home from close range after Abdullah Al-Zori's low drilled cross had taken a fortunate deflection off Jang Kuk-chol and North Korea handed Saudi Arabia a third goal just two minutes later as Jang Song-hyok's overhit backpass caused confusion between Ri Yong-jik and Ri Myong-guk on the edge of the penalty area, and with the defender only able to drill his attempted clearance against Al Sahlawi, the striker simply rolled the ball into the empty net. Al Sahlawi had a chance to seal his hat-trick with 19 minutes remaining, but after racing clear of the North Korea backline and with only Ri Myong-guk to beat, the striker poked his effort wide shortly before being substituted.

Saudi Arabia, though, did add a fourth with 13 minutes remaining through Al-Abed, who had seen his penalty saved by Ri Myong-guk after Ri Yong-jik's sending-off in unfortunate circumstances.

14 January 2015
18:00 AEDT (UTC+11)

| North Korea | 1–4 | Saudi Arabia |
|---|---|---|
| Ryang Yong-gi 12' | Report | Hazazi 37'; Al-Sahlawi 52', 54'; Al Abed 76' |

Melbourne Rectangular Stadium, Melbourne
Attendance: 12,349
Referee: Abdullah Al Hilali (Oman)

| North Korea | Saudi Arabia |

| GK | 1 | Ri Myong-guk |
| RB | 16 | Cha Jong-hyok | | (substituted off) 58' |
| CB | 15 | Jang Kuk-chol |
| CB | 3 | Jang Song-hyok |
| LB | 4 | Jon Kwang-ik |
| DM | 19 | Ri Yong-jik | (red card) 75' |
| CM | 9 | Pak Song-chol (c) | | (substituted off) 55' |
| CM | 8 | Ryang Yong-gi | | (substituted off) 87' |
| RW | 11 | Jong Il-gwan | (yellow card) 1' |
| LW | 13 | Sim Hyon-jin | (yellow card) 71' |
| CF | 10 | Pak Kwang-ryong |
Substitutions:
| MF | 21 | O Hyok-chol | | (substituted on) 55' |
| DF | 6 | Ro Hak-su | | (substituted on) 58' |
| FW | 20 | Choe Won | (yellow card) 90+3' | (substituted on) 87' |
Manager:
Jo Tong-sop

| GK | 1 | Waleed Abdullah |
| RB | 12 | Hassan Fallatah |
| CB | 3 | Osama Hawsawi |
| CB | 5 | Omar Hawsawi |
| LB | 4 | Abdullah Al-Zori |
| CM | 14 | Saud Kariri (c) | (substituted off) 79' |
| CM | 7 | Salman Al-Faraj |
| RW | 9 | Naif Hazazi |
| AM | 20 | Nawaf Al Abed | (substituted off) 82' |
| LW | 18 | Salem Al-Dawsari |
| CF | 10 | Mohammad Al-Sahlawi | (substituted off) 74' |
Substitutions:
| MF | 17 | Taisir Al-Jassim | (substituted on) 74' |
| MF | 15 | Ibrahim Ghaleb | (substituted on) 79' |
| FW | 19 | Fahad Al-Muwallad | (substituted on) 82' |
Manager:
(Romania) Cosmin Olăroiu

Man of the Match:

- Nawaf Al Abed (Saudi Arabia)

Assistant referees:

- Hamad Al-Mayahi (Oman)
- Abu Bakar Al-Amri (Oman)

Fourth official:

- Ammar Al-Jeneibi (United Arab Emirates)

Fifth official:

- Yagi Akane (Japan)

=== China vs Uzbekistan ===
China returned to the AFC Asian Cup quarter-finals after an 11-year absence with a come-from-behind 2–1 win against Uzbekistan at Brisbane Stadium, their first ever victory over Uzbekistan at any official tournament since the 2002 FIFA World Cup qualification, having won only once, drawn once and lost three previous encounters over the Uzbeks. 2011 edition semi-finalists Uzbekistan drew first blood midway through the opening half thanks to Odil Ahmedov, but China turned the tables on the white wolves after the break with goals from Wu Xi and substitute Sun Ke to grab the three points and the first ticket to the second round from Group B. Uzbekistan lie third behind Saudi Arabia on goal difference, with North Korea at the foot of the table. The Chinese came close to breaking the deadlock in the fifth minute, when Wu Lei surged through the middle to latch on to a cross from the left, only to miss by inches. China duly got a taste of their own medicine after 22 minutes when Ahmedov shook off Wu outside the box before letting rip a shot. Wu recovered, sliding in to attempt to block Ahmedov's shot - but only succeeded in changing the trajectory of the ball, which escaped goalkeeper Wang Dalei and bounced into the net.

Uzbekistan took the lead into the break but failed to hold on, as China restored parity on 55 minutes. Striker Gao Lin set things up with a dazzling assist from the right by-line, flicking the ball into the path of Wu who atoned for his first-half deflection by firing home into the bottom left corner to make it 1–1. Alain Perrin's side then moved in front through Sun Ke. Just two minutes after coming on, Sun beat Ignatiy Nesterov fair and square from the edge of the box, curling his shot beyond the outstretched arms of the Uzbekistan custodian to hand China the advantage.

China were in the ascendancy, and twice came close to extending their advantage, defender Zhang Linpeng missing a completely free shot from the centre of the penalty area and Sun failing to put away a second in a one-on-one with Nesterov. Uzbekistan could not claw their way back into the match before the Chinese supporters erupted after three minutes of stoppage time and the final whistle.

14 January 2015
19:00 AEST (UTC+10)

| China | 2–1 | Uzbekistan |
|---|---|---|
| Wu Xi 54'; Sun Ke 68' | Report | Ahmedov 23' |

Brisbane Stadium, Brisbane
Attendance: 13,674
Referee: Mohammed Abdulla Hassan Mohamed (United Arab Emirates)

| China | Uzbekistan |

| GK | 23 | Wang Dalei |
| RB | 5 | Zhang Linpeng |
| CB | 3 | Mei Fang |
| CB | 2 | Ren Hang | (yellow card) 35' |
| LB | 4 | Jiang Zhipeng |
| DM | 10 | Zheng Zhi (c) |
| RM | 17 | Zhang Chengdong | | (substituted off) 81' |
| CM | 15 | Wu Xi |
| LM | 21 | Yu Hai | | (substituted off) 46' |
| SS | 7 | Wu Lei |
| CF | 18 | Gao Lin | | (substituted off) 66' |
Substitutions:
| MF | 11 | Hao Junmin | | (substituted on) 46' |
| FW | 16 | Sun Ke | | (substituted on) 66' |
| FW | 19 | Liu Binbin | | (substituted on) 81' |
Manager:
(France) Alain Perrin

| GK | 12 | Ignatiy Nesterov |
| CB | 3 | Shavkat Mullajanov | (yellow card) 18' | (substituted off) 46' |
| CB | 7 | Azizbek Haydarov |
| CB | 5 | Anzur Ismailov |
| RM | 23 | Akmal Shorakhmedov |
| CM | 18 | Timur Kapadze |
| CM | 9 | Odil Ahmedov |
| LM | 19 | Vitaliy Denisov |
| AM | 17 | Sanzhar Tursunov | | (substituted off) 71' |
| AM | 8 | Server Djeparov (c) | | (substituted off) 62' |
| CF | 11 | Igor Sergeev |
Substitutions:
| DF | 20 | Islom Tukhtakhodjaev | | (substituted on) 46' |
| FW | 4 | Sardor Rashidov | | (substituted on) 62' |
| MF | 15 | Jasur Hasanov | | (substituted on) 71' |
Manager:
Mirjalol Qosimov

Man of the Match:

- Wu Xi (China)

Assistant referees:

- Mohamed Al Hammadi (United Arab Emirates)
- Hasan Al Mahri (United Arab Emirates)

Fourth official:

- Hettikamkanamge Perera (Sri Lanka)

Fifth official:

- Palitha Hemathunga (Sri Lanka)

=== Uzbekistan vs Saudi Arabia ===
Sardor Rashidov scored twice as Uzbekistan set up a quarter-final match with South Korea after securing a crucial 3–1 win over Saudi Arabia. Uzbekistan had to win to deny Saudi Arabia a place in the last eight and they enjoyed the ideal start at Melbourne Rectangular Stadium as the 23-year-old winger netted inside the opening two minutes. Mohammad Al-Sahlawi did pull Saudi Arabia level from the penalty spot on the hour mark, but after substitute Vokhid Shodiev restored Uzbekistan's advantage 11 minutes later, Rashidov's second of the night with just over 10 minutes remaining saw Mirjalol Qosimov's side secure a fourth consecutive quarter-finals appearance.

Needing to win to progress from Group B alongside table-toppers China PR, Mirjalol Qosimov made five changes following Wednesday's defeat by China, with captain Server Djeparov, Sanzhar Tursunov, Igor Sergeev, Timur Kapadze and Akmal Shorakhmedov relegated to the bench. And it was one of their replacements who handed Uzbekistan the ideal start inside 90 seconds as Rashidov charged into the penalty area following poor defending by Saudi Arabia, coupled with a fortunate deflection, before coolly guiding his strike through the legs of goalkeeper Waleed Abdullah at his near post.

Uzbekistan remained on top as the half progressed against a shell-shocked Saudi Arabia who continued to struggle to settle into the contest with Cosmin Olăroiu's side, who showed one change from their win over North Korea last time out, only needing a draw to progress at the expense of their opponents. Saudi Arabia did enjoy a brighter end to the first half, although Uzbekistan goalkeeper Ignatiy Nesterov remained largely untested. The tight nature of the contest continued at the start of the second half, although despite Uzbekistan enjoying the greater share of possession, Saudi Arabia goalkeeper Abdullah was also enjoying a quiet evening following the early goal but the game suddenly swung Saudi Arabia's way on the hour mark as Al-Sahlawi confidently beat Nesterov from the penalty spot after Vitaliy Denisov had been adjudged to have bundled over Naif Hazazi inside the area as the pair challenged to meet Abdullah Al-Zori's left-wing cross.

Saudi Arabia, though, were back on level terms for just 11 minutes as Shodiev, who replaced Jamshid Iskanderov shortly after the equaliser, out-jumped Yasser Al-Shahrani to meet Shavkat Mullajanov's right wing cross, and the striker guided his header back across the face and goal and into the bottom corner with Abdullah rooted to the spot. And with Saudi Arabia pushing forward, Rashidov was found in space on the near side by Jasur Khasanov's superb cross field pass and the midfielder beat exposed goalkeeper Abdullah from inside the penalty area to double Uzbekistan's lead and hand 2007 finalists Saudi Arabia a second consecutive group stage exit.

18 January 2015
20:00 AEDT (UTC+11)

| Uzbekistan | 3–1 | Saudi Arabia |
|---|---|---|
| Rashidov 2', 78'; Shodiev 71' | Report | Al-Sahlawi 60' (pen.) |

Melbourne Rectangular Stadium, Melbourne
Attendance: 10,871
Referee: Ben Williams (Australia)

| Uzbekistan | Saudi Arabia |

| GK | 12 | Ignatiy Nesterov |
| RB | 14 | Shukhrat Mukhammadiev | (yellow card) 53' | (substituted off) 87' |
| CB | 3 | Shavkat Mullajanov |
| CB | 5 | Anzur Ismailov | (yellow card) 58' |
| LB | 19 | Vitaliy Denisov | (yellow card) 59' |
| DM | 7 | Azizbek Haydarov |
| RM | 10 | Jamshid Iskanderov | | (substituted off) 66' |
| CM | 9 | Odil Ahmedov (c) |
| LM | 15 | Jasur Hasanov |
| SS | 4 | Sardor Rashidov | | (substituted off) 89' |
| CF | 6 | Bahodir Nasimov |
Substitutions:
| FW | 16 | Vokhid Shodiev | (yellow card) 78' | (substituted on) 66' |
| DF | 23 | Akmal Shorakhmedov | | (substituted on) 87' |
| MF | 17 | Sanzhar Tursunov | | (substituted on) 89' |
| MF | 22 | Farrukh Sayfiev | Yellow card |
Manager:
Mirjalol Qosimov

| GK | 1 | Waleed Abdullah |
| RB | 4 | Abdullah Al-Zori |
| CB | 3 | Osama Hawsawi | (yellow card) 90+2' |
| CB | 5 | Omar Hawsawi |
| LB | 13 | Yasser Al-Shahrani |
| CM | 14 | Saud Kariri (c) | | (substituted off) 74' |
| CM | 7 | Salman Al-Faraj |
| RW | 9 | Naif Hazazi |
| AM | 20 | Nawaf Al-Abed | | (substituted off) 90+2' |
| LW | 18 | Salem Al-Dawsari | (yellow card) 62' | (substituted off) 83' |
| CF | 10 | Mohammad Al-Sahlawi | (yellow card) 68' |
Substitutions:
| MF | 17 | Taisir Al-Jassim | | (substituted on) 74' |
| MF | 8 | Yahya Al-Shehri | | (substituted on) 83' |
| FW | 19 | Fahad Al-Muwallad | | (substituted on) 90+2' |
Manager:
(Romania) Cosmin Olăroiu

Man of the Match:

- Sardor Rashidov (Uzbekistan)

Assistant referees:

- Matthew Cream (Australia)
- Paul Cetrangolo (Australia)

Fourth official:

- Ammar Al-Jeneibi (United Arab Emirates)

Fifth official:

- Yagi Akane (Japan)

=== China vs North Korea ===
Sun Ke's brace saw quarter-final bound China complete their first-ever 100-percent record in the group stages of the AFC Asian Cup, after the Group B winners edged North Korea 2–1 at Canberra Stadium. With hosts Australia awaiting in the quarter-finals at Brisbane Stadium, China were set on the way within the first minute by Sun, before he added his second shortly before the interval.

A Gao Lin own-goal did see North Korea pull one back and So Hyon-uk hit the frame of the goal late on as the Chollima pressed hard for an equaliser, but China were eventually able to see out the third straight win of their campaign. Both sides had entered the final round of fixtures with their destiny's already confirmed with China guaranteed to top the table following wins over Saudi Arabia and Uzbekistan, while North Korea's campaign had been prematurely ended following defeats by the same opposition. China coach Alain Perrin stuck to his promise of going for a third successive win by selecting eight of the side who started in the 2–1 win over Uzbekistan, amongst them match-winning substitute Sun making his first start.

For North Korea, midfielder O Hyok-chol and defender Ro Hak-su lined-up for the first time with Ri Yong-jik suspended after his sending-off against Saudi Arabia in the 4–1 defeat on 14 January. Canberra Stadium had seen the UAE's Ali Mabkhout score the AFC Asian Cup's fastest ever goal after 14 seconds in the previous fixture against Bahrain and Australia's capital was witness to an explosive start for a second consecutive match. Mei Fang's long ball up from the back was not dealt with by the North Korea backline and Sun nipped in to tuck the ball between the legs of North Korea goalkeeper Ri Myong-guk within the game's opening minute. Emboldened by the early lead China dominated for large periods of the first half, although North Korea did have a few efforts from distance with O Hyok-chol and Jon Kwang-ik having a go from range. And on 39 minutes, Jong Il-gwan had a glorious chance to equalise after his give-and-go with O Hyok-chol saw him put through on goal but the stretching striker could only lift his shot well over Wang Dalei's crossbar.

The miss was costly as just three minutes later China went two up with Sun again on the scoresheet. Jiang Zhipeng found himself in space on the flank and his curling cross from the left-side was met with a diving header from Sun at the back post that Ri couldn't keep out. The advantage could have been three just before half-time, too, as Yu Hai's chipped effort lofted over Ri but not Jon on the line who cleared. In the second half, though, North Korea came out determined to haul themselves back into the game and they reduced the deficit 11 minutes after the restart. Pak Kwang-ryong's cross reached Jong in the right-hand side of the area and although the striker's shot was blocked on the line by Zhang Linpeng, the defender's attempted clearance ricocheted off the back of the unsuspecting Gao and into the net. And Jong could have made the scores even just two minutes later as he met Ro's cross with a leaping header from the penalty spot but his attempt soared narrowly over. North Korea continued their second half renaissance and on the 81st minute a scooped pass from Sim Hyon-jin was met on the volley from So and his pile-driver from 25 yards out hit the crossbar at full force with Wang beaten. Jo Tong-sop's side continued to press China in the final minutes but they were unable to make a breakthrough and exited the tournament pointless for the first time in their AFC Asian Cup history.

18 January 2015
20:00 AEDT (UTC+11)

| China | 2–1 | North Korea |
|---|---|---|
| Sun Ke 1', 42' | Report | Gao Lin 57' (o.g.) |

Canberra Stadium, Canberra
Attendance: 18,457
Referee: Abdulrahman Abdou (Qatar)

| China | North Korea |

| GK | 23 | Wang Dalei |
| CB | 10 | Zheng Zhi (c) | | (substituted off) 53' |
| CB | 3 | Mei Fang |
| CB | 8 | Cai Huikang | (yellow card) 66' |
| RWB | 5 | Zhang Linpeng | | (substituted off) 81' |
| LWB | 4 | Jiang Zhipeng | (yellow card) 17' |
| CM | 17 | Zhang Chengdong |
| CM | 11 | Hao Junmin |
| CM | 21 | Yu Hai |
| SS | 16 | Sun Ke | | (substituted off) 70' |
| CF | 18 | Gao Lin |
Substitutions:
| FW | 20 | Yu Hanchao | | (substituted on) 53' |
| MF | 15 | Wu Xi | | (substituted on) 70' |
| DF | 6 | Li Ang | | (substituted on) 81' |
Manager:
(France) Alain Perrin

| GK | 1 | Ri Myong-guk |
| RB | 6 | Ro Hak-su |
| CB | 15 | Jang Kuk-chol |
| CB | 3 | Jang Song-hyok |
| LB | 4 | Jon Kwang-ik |
| CM | 9 | Pak Song-chol (c) | (substituted off) 35' |
| CM | 8 | Ryang Yong-gi |
| RW | 11 | Jong Il-gwan |
| AM | 21 | O Hyok-chol | (substituted off) 80' |
| LW | 13 | Sim Hyon-jin |
| CF | 10 | Pak Kwang-ryong | (substituted off) 70' |
Substitutions:
| DF | 5 | Han Song-hyok | (substituted on) 35' |
| FW | 17 | So Hyon-uk | (substituted on) 70' |
| FW | 20 | Choe Won | (substituted on) 80' |
Manager:
Jo Tong-sop

Man of the Match:

- Sun Ke (China)

Assistant referees:

- Taleb Al-Marri (Qatar)
- Ramzan Al-Naemi (Qatar)

Fourth official:

- Mohd Amirul Izwan (Malaysia)

Fifth official:

- Mohd Yusri Muhamad (Malaysia)
