= Melbourne Rectangular Stadium =

Sports stadium in Melbourne, Victoria, Australia

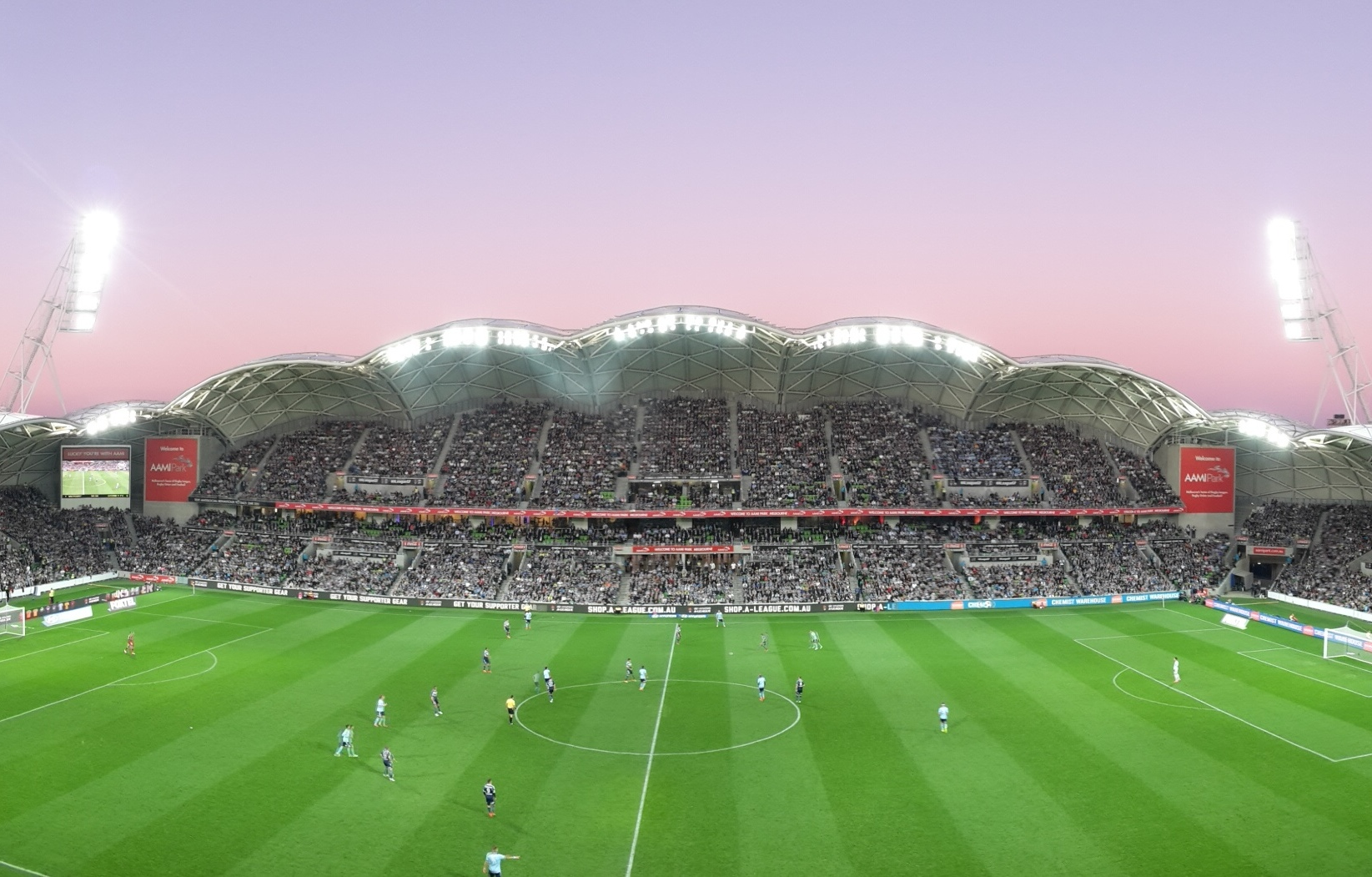
- The stadium hosting the 2015 A-League Grand Final
- Interactive map of Melbourne Rectangular Stadium
- Full name: Melbourne Rectangular Stadium
- Former names: Swan St Stadium (2007–2010)
- Address: Olympic Blvd; Melbourne VIC 3004; Australia
- Location: Olympic Boulevard; Melbourne, Victoria, Australia
- Coordinates: 37°49′31″S 144°59′2″E
- Owner: Victoria State Government
- Operator: Melbourne & Olympic Parks Trust
- Seating type: All-seater
- Capacity: 30,050 (total); 29,500 (rugby)
- Executive suites: 24
- Surface: StaLok Turf
- Scoreboard: Two curved scoreboards in opposite corners
- Record attendance: Sporting event: 29,911 (10 October 2026; South Melbourne vs Melbourne Victory; Australia Cup Final)
- Field size: 136 m × 85 m (446 ft × 279 ft)
- Field shape: Rectangular
- Public transit: Richmond ■ Olympic Boulevard
- Parking: Parking available at John Cain Arena

Construction
- Groundbreaking: 2007; 19 years ago
- Built: 2010; 16 years ago
- Opened: 7 May 2010; 16 years ago
- Renovated: 2023
- Years active: 2010–present
- Cost: A$268 million
- Architect: Cox Architecture
- Structural engineers: Arup; Norman Disney & Young
- General contractor: Grocon

Tenants
- Rugby League; Melbourne Storm (NRL) (2010–present); Rugby Union; Melbourne Rebels (Super Rugby and Super W) (2011–2024); Soccer; Melbourne City FC (A-League Men and Women) (2010–present); Melbourne Victory (A-League Men and Women) (2010–present); Western United (A-League Men and Women) (2020–2024); Socceroos and Matildas (select international matches); Australian rules football Melbourne Football Club (AFL) (training, 2010–present)

Website
- https://aamipark.com.au

Melbourne Rectangular Stadium (known under naming rights as AAMI Park) is a stadium located in the Melbourne Sports and Entertainment Precinct in Melbourne. It is primarily used for soccer, and rugby league as the home ground of the Melbourne Victory FC and Melbourne City FC in the A-League men's and women's competitions and the Melbourne Storm in the National Rugby League (NRL).

Built in 2010, the stadium replaced Olympic Park as Melbourne’s primary rectangular stadium, with it also being the first large stadium to be purpose built for rectangular sports, as Olympic Park was designed for Track and Field. Boasting a capacity of 30,050, it is Melbourne’s third largest stadium.

The stadium served as a venue during the 2023 FIFA Women’s World Cup as well as the 2015 AFC Asian Cup, and 2017 Rugby League World Cup where it hosted the opening match in both tournaments. It also hosted matches in the Rugby League Four Nations in 2010 and 2014.

== History ==
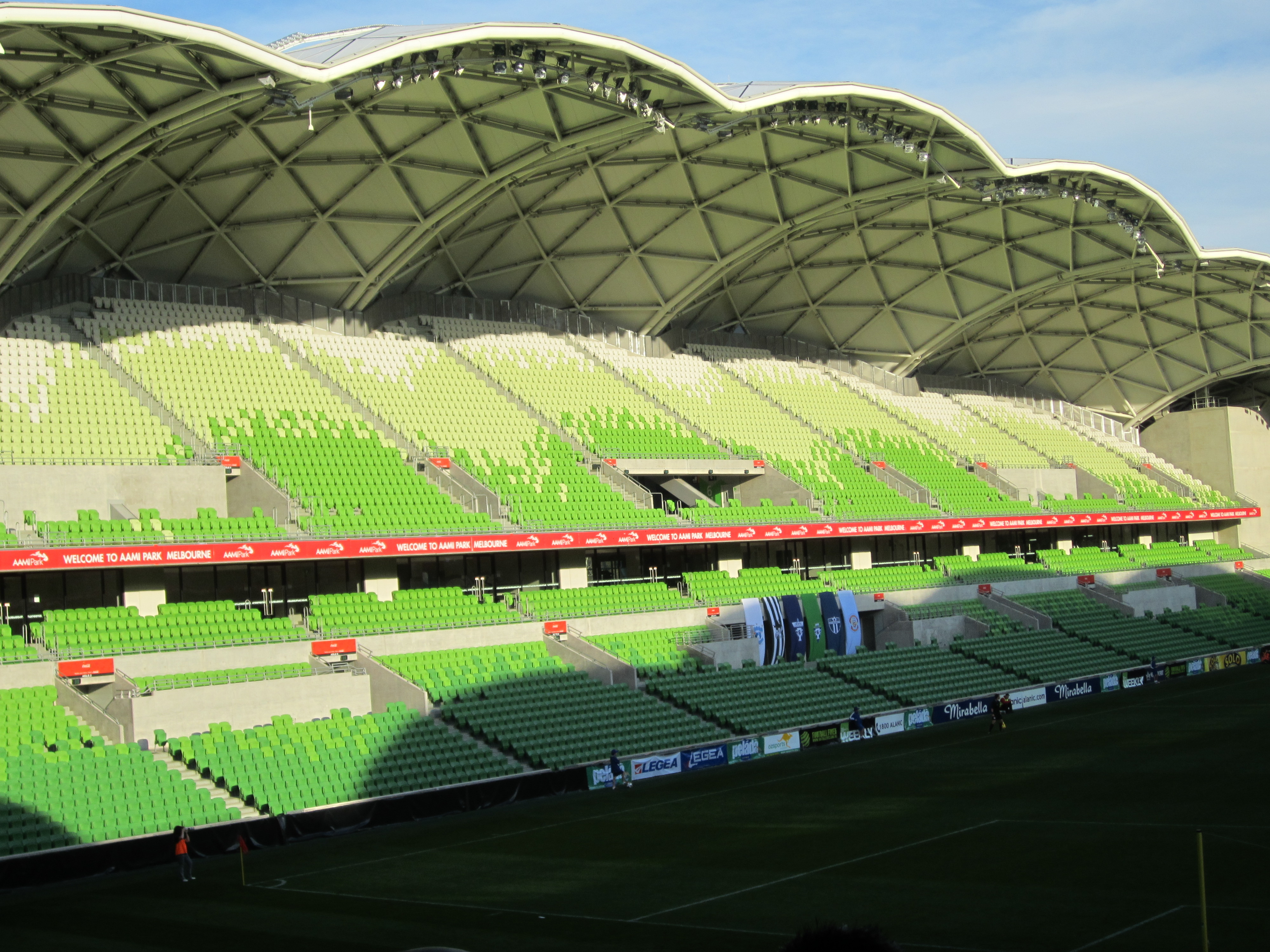
Melbourne Rectangular Stadium Eastern Stand

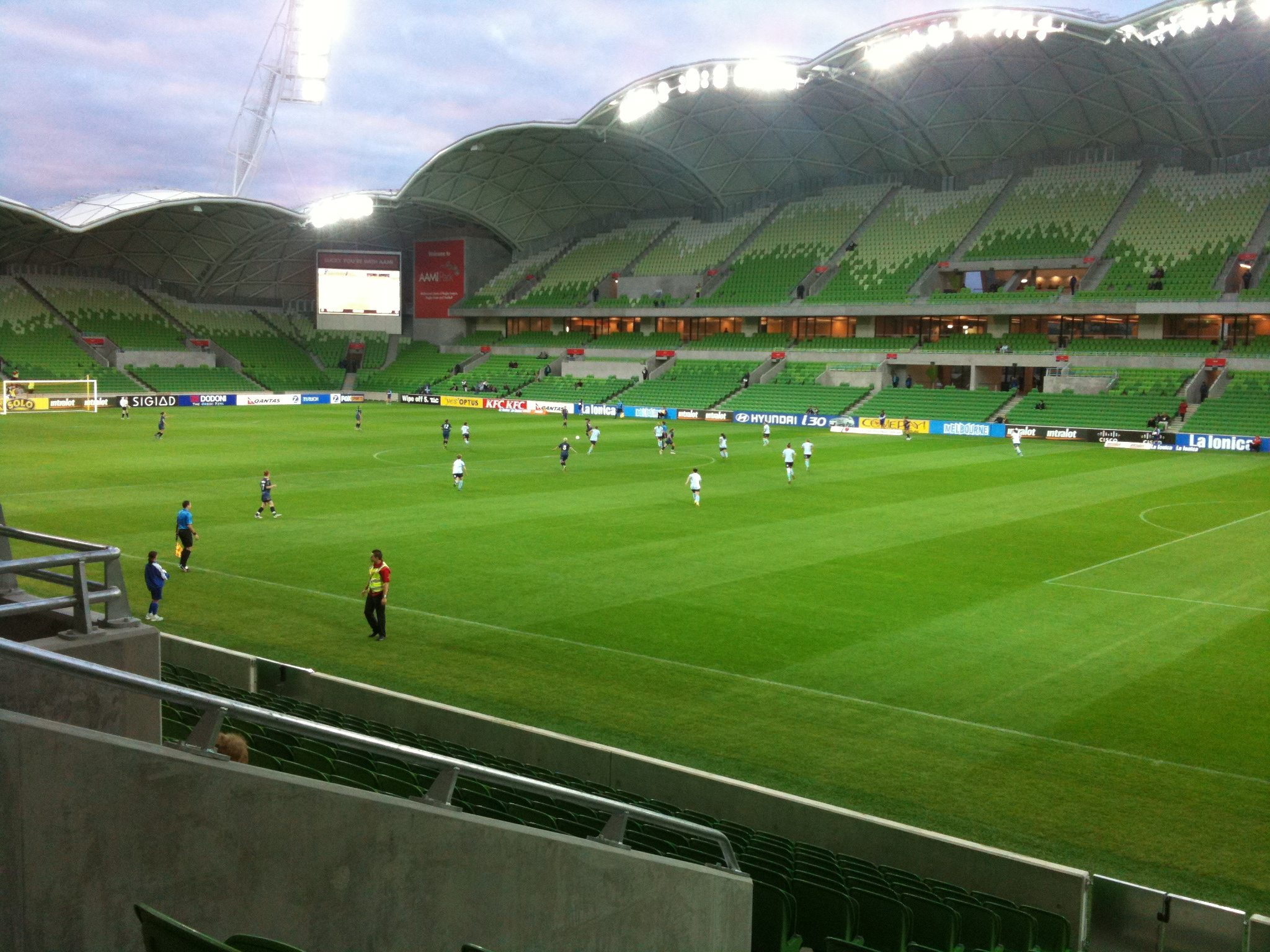
Melbourne Rectangular Stadium interior

=== Prior to construction ===
Until 2010, Olympic Park Stadium was Melbourne's main venue for soccer, rugby league and rugby union; not purpose-built, it was an athletics stadium with the rectangular grass field set inside the running track, and it could hold 18,500 spectators, but only 11,000 seated. It had been the home ground of the Melbourne Storm since they entered the National Rugby League in 1998. The A-League Men's Melbourne Victory FC also used Olympic Park Stadium from 2005 to 2007 when they switched permanently to Docklands Stadium.

In 2004, as part of Melbourne's bid for a Super Rugby team, the Victorian Government prepared an economic impact study on the development of a world class rectangular stadium in Melbourne. But in late 2004, the bid lost out to the Western Australian consortium, which would become the Western Force.

On 6 April 2006 the Victorian Government announced that a $190 million 20,000-seat rectangular stadium would be built on the site of Edwin Flack Field and would be home to NRL team Melbourne Storm and A-League Men team Melbourne Victory. The stadium's planned capacity was increased to 30,000, with foundations capable of expansion to a capacity of 50,000 if needed. The stadium began construction in late 2007.

In November 2009, when the Super Rugby competition expanded to 15 teams, the Melbourne consortium won the 15th Super Rugby licence, with the new franchise intending to play their games at the new stadium.

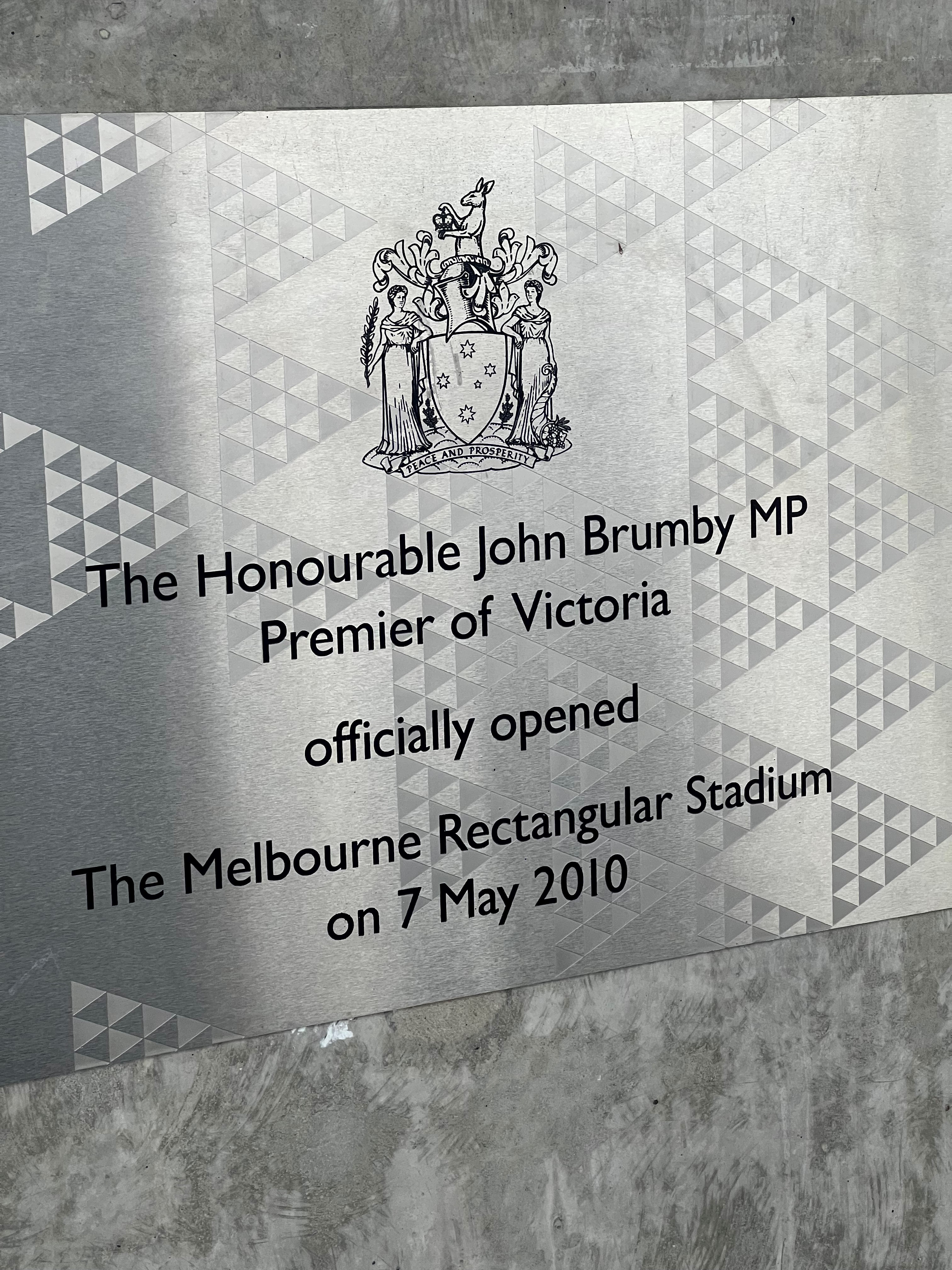
Stadium plaque noting the official name and opening date

The stadium's first match was the 2010 Anzac Test between the Australian and New Zealand rugby league teams on 7 May 2010, with the stadium formally opened by then Victorian premier John Brumby. The stadium was referred to as Melbourne Rectangular Stadium, Swan Street Stadium or the Bubble Dome during its early construction. The stadium's commercial name was announced as AAMI Park on 16 March 2010; initially an eight-year deal, it has been twice extended with the current AAMI sponsorship deal set to expire in 2026.

=== Notable events hosted: 2010s ===
==== Rugby league ====
The stadium held its first event, rugby league's 2010 Anzac Test, on 7 May 2010. The opening ceremony featured the NRL's all-time highest point-scorer, Hazem El Masri, who had retired the previous season, kicking a goal. The first points scored on the ground were from a Jamie Lyon penalty kick in the 32nd minute, and the first try was scored by Brett Morris in the 39th minute. Australia defeated New Zealand 12–8 in front of a sell-out crowd (near 30,000). Two days later the first National Rugby League match was played at the stadium when the Brisbane Broncos defeated the Melbourne Storm in front of a crowd of 20,042.

Melbourne Rectangular Stadium hosted international matches as part of the Rugby League Four Nations in 2010 and 2014, when Australia defeated England by 34–14 in front of 18,894 fans on 31 October 2010, and again when Australia defeated England by 16–12 on 2 November 2014 (attendance: 20,585). The stadium hosted two matches of the 2017 Rugby League World Cup: the opening match of the tournament between Australia and England, which saw the latter prevail 18-4 in front of a crowd of 22,724, and the quarter final match between England and Papua New Guinea, which saw the latter prevail 36-6 in front of a crowd of 10,563.

==== Soccer ====
Melbourne Victory FC and Melbourne City FC both play at the stadium.

On 5 August 2010 the stadium played host to its first A-Leagues match. It was also another first, as the newly formed Melbourne Heart FC played their first game in front of 11,050 fans against the Central Coast Mariners. The Heart lost 1–0, and Alex Wilkinson won the honour of scoring the first goal. The first Melbourne Victory match was played at Melbourne Rectangular Stadium v Perth Glory on 14 August 2010 in front of 21,193 fans.

The venue hosted the 2015 AFC Asian Cup opening ceremony and seven international matches including the tournament opener between Australia and Kuwait on 9 January, and a quarter-final match South Korea and Uzbekistan on 22 January.

From the 2020-21 A-League season to the 2023-24 A-League season, Western United FC began also playing home games out of the Melbourne Rectangular Stadium, while they awaited the construction of their new home base, Ironbark Fields, in Tarneit. Western United's last home game at the stadium prior to the completion of Ironbark Fields occurred on 14 March 2024 against crosstown rivals Melbourne Victory, with the match concluding in a 2-2 draw in front of a crowd of 3058. On 28 October 2024, Western United announced that their 2024-25 A-League Men season home games against Melbourne City and Melbourne Victory on 4 November 2024 and 1 December 2024 respectively would be played at AAMI Park.

AAMI Park played host to 6 Matches as part of the FIFA Women's World Cup 2023 under its non-commercial name of Melbourne Rectangular Stadium. It also acted as a secondary live site for the Australia vs England semi-final match, as well as the primary live site for the third-place match and the final when Federation Square decided to stop showing matches.

The Stadium hosted two Open Training Sessions on 21 & 23 May 2024 as part of Global Football Week Melbourne. The Session on 21 May 2024 included Tottenham Hotspur and the A-Leagues All Stars Men, while the Session on 23 May 2024 included Arsenal Women's and the A-Leagues All Stars Women.

==== Rugby union ====
The Melbourne Rebels played their first Super Rugby match at Melbourne Rectangular Stadium on 18 February 2011. The Melbourne Rising played their first National Rugby Championship match on 24 August 2014, defeating the North Harbour Rays by a resounding 55–34 score. The Rising played a semifinal at the stadium on 25 October 2014, but lost by 29–45 to the Perth Spirit. The Melbourne Rebels played their last match at the stadium on 17 May 2024 against the Chiefs, with the Rebels losing 23–26.

==== Melbourne Football Club (AFL) training and administrative facilities ====
The Melbourne Football Club in the Australian Football League (AFL) moved its indoor training facilities to the park in 2010, and train at their nearby outdoor training ground at Gosch's Paddock, with its administration staff continuing to be based at the Melbourne Cricket Ground.

== Stadium design ==
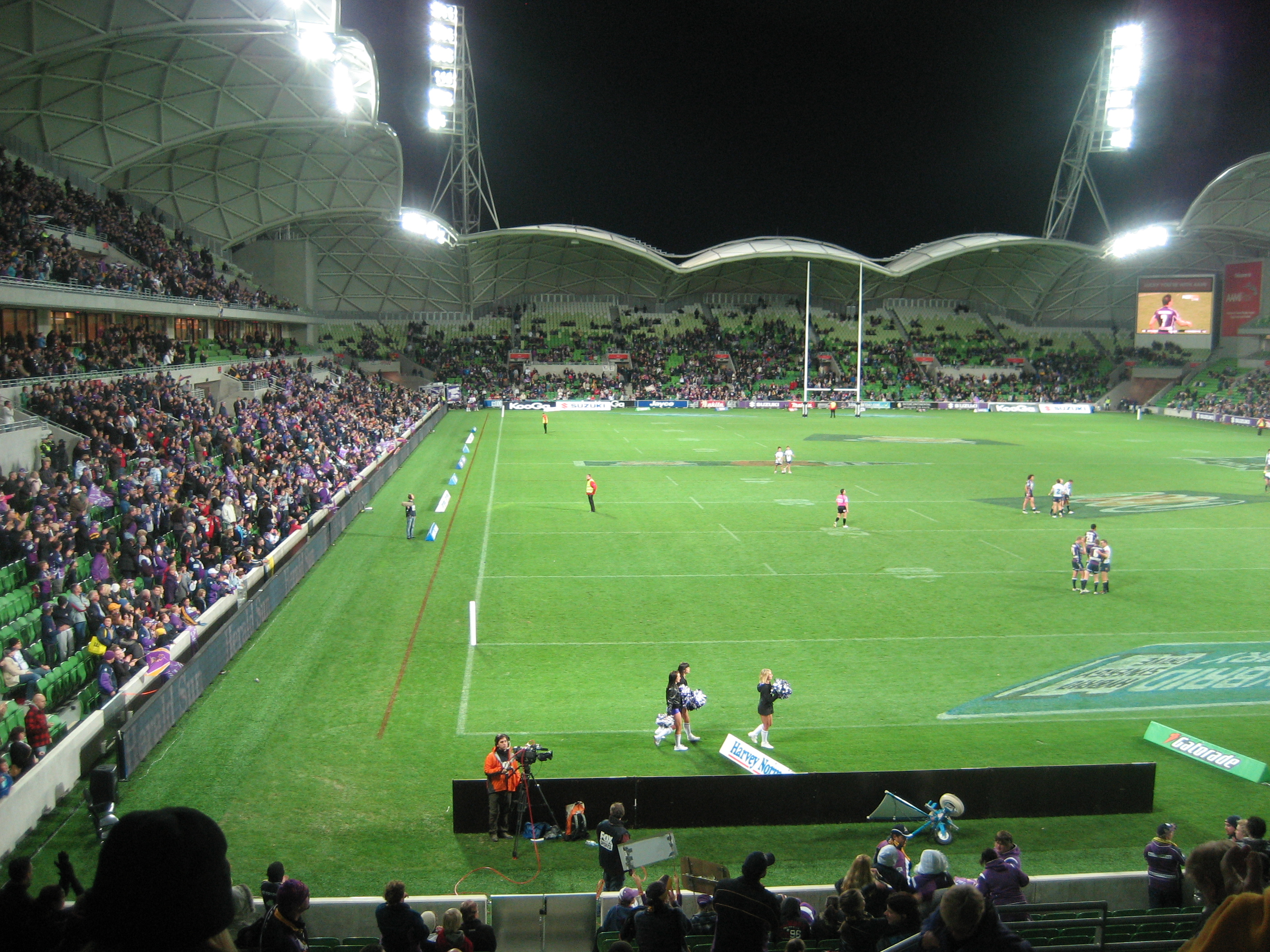
Stadium from the north (Olympic Boulevard) end

=== Features ===
The COX Architecture designed stadium features a "Bioframe" design, with a geodesic dome roof covering much of the seating area, while still allowing light through to the pitch. The northern and southern sides of the stadiums are called the Olympic Side and Yarra Side respectively. The exterior of the stadium is covered in thousands of LED lights which can be programmed to display a variety of patterns and images.

The stadium includes training facilities and office accommodation for Melbourne Storm, Melbourne Victory, Melbourne Football Club, the Victorian Rugby Union, the Victorian Olympic Council, Olympic Park Sports Medicine Centre (OPSMC), Imaging@Olympic Park Radiology and Tennis Victoria. The stadium is used by the Melbourne Demons as their administration headquarters. The team had wanted the stadium completed by 2008 to coincide with its 150th anniversary. It has planned to house public bars and cafes, 24 corporate boxes, a dining room with a capacity of 1000 people, a gym and lap pool.

=== Capacity ===
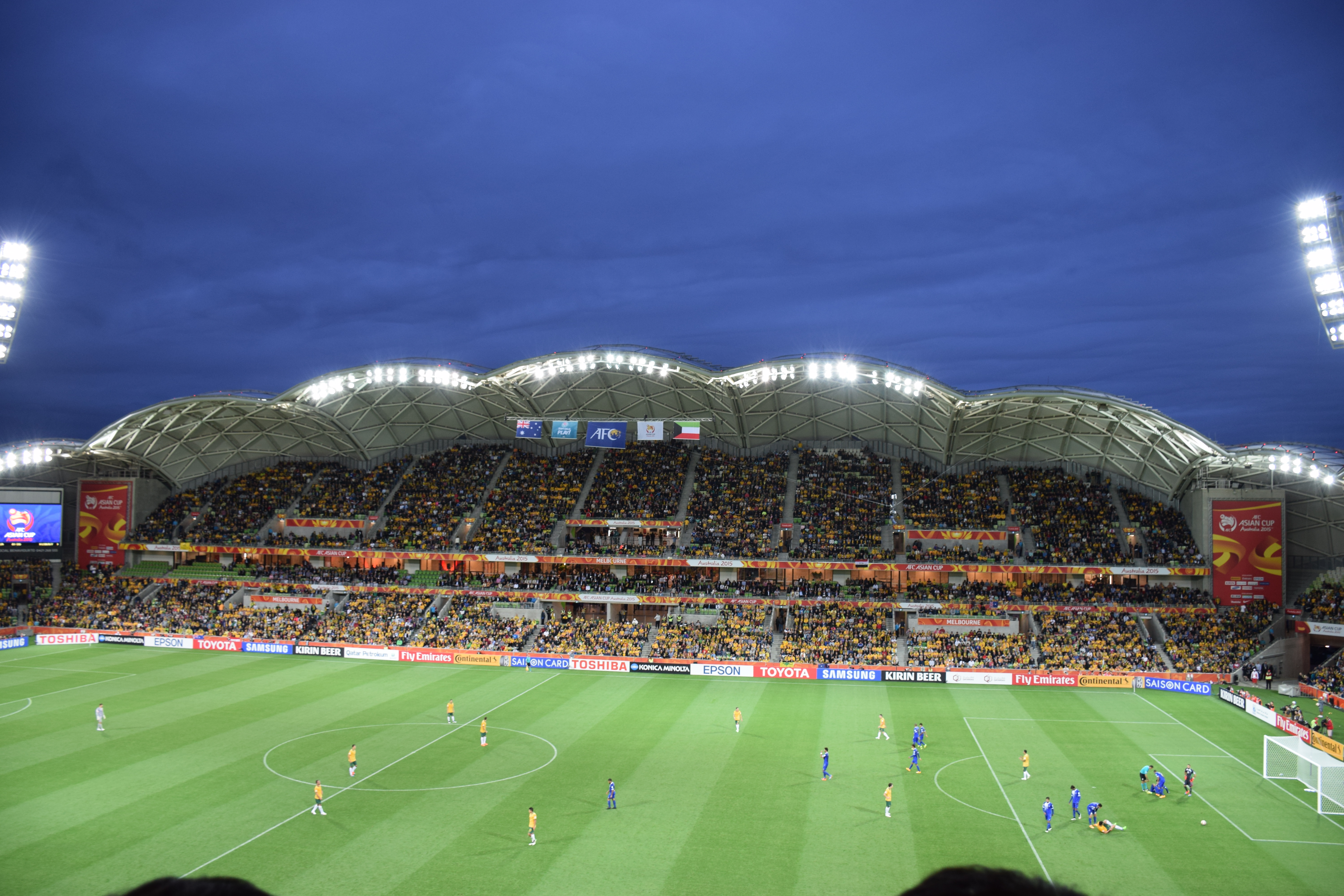
Australia v Kuwait during the 2015 AFC Asian Cup

The stadium was initially proposed to have a seating capacity of 20,000, upgradeable to 25,000. This was due to both expected demand, as well as a state government agreement with Docklands Stadium that no stadiums with a capacity greater than 30,000 would be constructed in Melbourne before 2010. These plans were revised after the Victory refused to commit to playing at a stadium of such small capacity, having achieved an average attendance of over 27,000 since their move to the Docklands Stadium in the 2006–07 A-League Season.

Alternative plans put forward by the Victorian Government proposed a capacity of 30,050, on the condition that the Victory sign on as a tenant. An agreement was reached and the stadium went ahead at this capacity. To assist with the extended capacity, temporary stands can be erected behind the goals during soccer matches and removed during rugby league and union games so as to allow space for the in-goal area (an international soccer pitch measures 105 metres in length, while including the in-goal areas, rugby league and rugby union have a minimum field length of 116 and 120 metres respectively). Although the stadium was built with foundations to allow for future expansion to 50,000, the roof was not designed with this in mind, and so the stadium cannot be expanded without major construction work. Construction of the stadium was featured during a 2010 episode of the TV show Build It Bigger.

=== Upgrades ===
Following the stadium's opening in 2010, the stadium's features were first upgraded in early 2023, ahead of its fixtures for the 2023 FIFA Women's World Cup. The Victorian Government contributed $25 million to replace the old video screens with two new curved screens, install LED sports light technology in the light towers and under the roof canopy, and replace static advertising and wayfinding boards with LED. Player facilities, broadcasting and corporate facilities were also improved as a result of the upgrade.

== Crowd records ==
=== Concerts ===
Description	Event	Date	Attendance	Gross	Reference
Foo Fighters	Wasting Light Tour	2 & 3 December 2011	60,083 (over two nights)	N/A	
Bruce Springsteen & The E Street Band	High Hopes Tour	15 & 16 February 2014	62,950 / 62,950 (over two nights)	$9,185,208	
Taylor Swift	The 1989 World Tour	10, 11 & 12 December 2015	98,136 / 98,136 (over three nights)	$10,421,553	
Ed Sheeran	x Tour	5 & 6 December 2015	66,918 / 66,918 (over two nights)	N/A	
Bruce Springsteen & The E Street Band	The River Tour	2 & 4 February 2017	51,192 / 54,000 (over two nights)	$7,384,735	
Paul McCartney	One On One Tour	5 & 6 December 2017	59,002 / 59,002 (over two nights)	$9,623,682	
Robbie Williams	XXV Tour	22 & 23 November 2023			
Diljit Dosanjh	Aura Tour	1 November 2025			
Kendrick Lamar	Grand National Tour	3 & 4 December 2025			
Iron Maiden	Run For Your Lives World Tour	13 November 2026			

=== Sporting events ===
Sport	Description	Event	Date	Attendance	Reference
Association football (Finals)	South Melbourne FC vs Melbourne Victory FC	2026 Australia Cup final	10 October 2026	29,911	
Association football (Finals)	Melbourne City FC vs Melbourne Victory FC	2025 A-League Men Grand Final	31 May 2025	29,902	
Rugby union (International)	Australia vs England	2016 England rugby union tour of Australia, Second Test	18 June 2016	29,871	
Rugby league (International)	Australia vs New Zealand	2010 Anzac Test	7 May 2010	29,442	
Rugby league (Finals)	Melbourne Storm vs North Queensland Cowboys	2015 NRL Preliminary Final	26 September 2015	29,315	
Rugby league (Home & Away)	Melbourne Storm vs New Zealand Warriors	2014 NRL season	25 April 2014	28,716	
Rugby union (Friendly)	Melbourne Rebels vs British & Irish Lions	2013 British & Irish Lions tour	26 June 2013	28,658	
Association football (International)	Australia vs Vietnam	2022 FIFA World Cup qualification – AFC third round	27 January 2022	27,740	
Association football (Home & Away)	Melbourne Victory FC vs Sydney FC	2012–13 A-League	26 January 2013	26,882	
Rugby Union (Home & Away)	Melbourne Rebels vs New South Wales Waratahs	2011 Super Rugby season	18 February 2011	25,524	

== Rugby league test matches ==
The stadium has hosted six rugby league internationals. The results were as follows;

Test no.	Date	Winner	Result	Runner-up	Attendance	Part of
1	7 May 2010	Australia	12–8	New Zealand	29,442	2010 Anzac Test
2	31 October 2010	Australia	34–14	England	18,894	2010 Four Nations
3	2 November 2014	Australia	16–12	England	20,585	2014 Four Nations
4	27 October 2017	Australia	18–4	England	22,274	2017 Rugby League World Cup
5	19 November 2017	England	36–6	Papua New Guinea	10,563	2017 Rugby League World Cup
6	28 October 2023	Australia	36–18	New Zealand	20,584	2023 Pacific Cup

== Men's national soccer team results ==
The stadium has hosted six Australian men's international soccer matches. The results were as follows;

Match no.	Date	Home	Result	Opponent	Attendance	Part of
1	29 February 2012	Australia	4–2	Saudi Arabia	24,240	2014 FIFA World Cup qualification, Fourth Round
2	9 January 2015	Australia	4–1	Kuwait	25,231	2015 AFC Asian Cup
3	5 September 2017	Australia	2–1	Thailand	26,393	2018 FIFA World Cup qualification, Third Round
4	27 January 2022	Australia	4–0	Vietnam	27,740	2022 FIFA World Cup qualification – AFC third round
5	16 November 2023	Australia	7–0	Bangladesh	20,876	2026 FIFA World Cup qualification – AFC second round
6	14 November 2024	Australia	0–0	Saudi Arabia	27,491	2026 World Cup Qualifiers Round 3

== Women's national soccer team results ==
The stadium has hosted four Australian women's international matches. The results were as follows;

Match no.	Date	Home	Result	Opponent	Attendance	Part of
1	22 November 2017	Australia	3–0	China	10,904	Friendly
2	6 March 2019	Australia	3–0	Argentina	6,834	2019 Cup of Nations
3	12 November 2022	Australia	4–0	Sweden	22,065	Friendly
4	31 July 2023	Australia	3–0	Canada	27,706	2023 FIFA Women's World Cup

== 2015 AFC Asian Cup ==
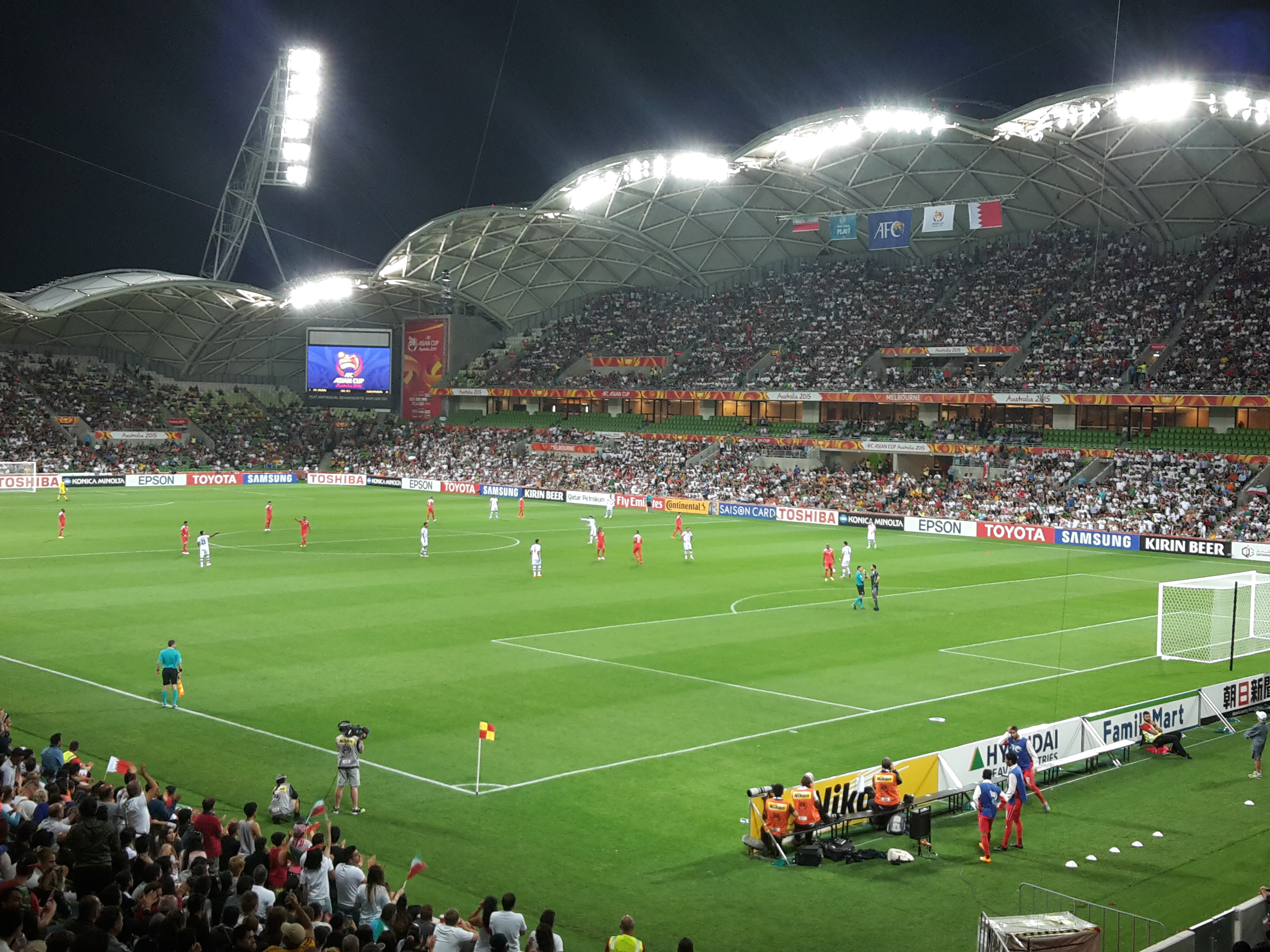
Iran v Bahrain during the 2015 AFC Asian Cup

Date	Team #1	Res.	Team #2	Stage	Attendance
9 January 2015	Australia	4–1	Kuwait	Group A	25,231
11 January 2015	Iran	2–0	Bahrain	Group C	17,712
14 January 2015	North Korea	1–4	Saudi Arabia	Group B	12,349
16 January 2015	Palestine	1–5	Jordan	Group D	10,808
18 January 2015	Uzbekistan	3–1	Saudi Arabia	Group B	10,871
20 January 2015	Japan	2–0	Jordan	Group D	25,016
22 January 2015	South Korea	2–0	Uzbekistan	Quarter-finals	23,381

== 2023 FIFA Women's World Cup ==
The venue hosted six matches of the 2023 FIFA Women's World Cup – four group games and two knockout ones. Seating capacity for the matches was reduced to 27,706 due to media requirements.

Date	Team #1	Res.	Team #2	Stage	Attendance
21 July 2023	Nigeria	0–0	Canada	Group B	21,410
24 July 2023	Germany	6–0	Morocco	Group H	27,256
31 July 2023	Canada	0–4	Australia	Group B	27,706
2 August 2023	Jamaica	0–0	Brazil	Group F	27,638
6 August 2023	Sweden	0–0 (5–4 pen.)	United States	Round of 16	27,706
8 August 2023	Colombia	1–0	Jamaica	Round of 16	27,706

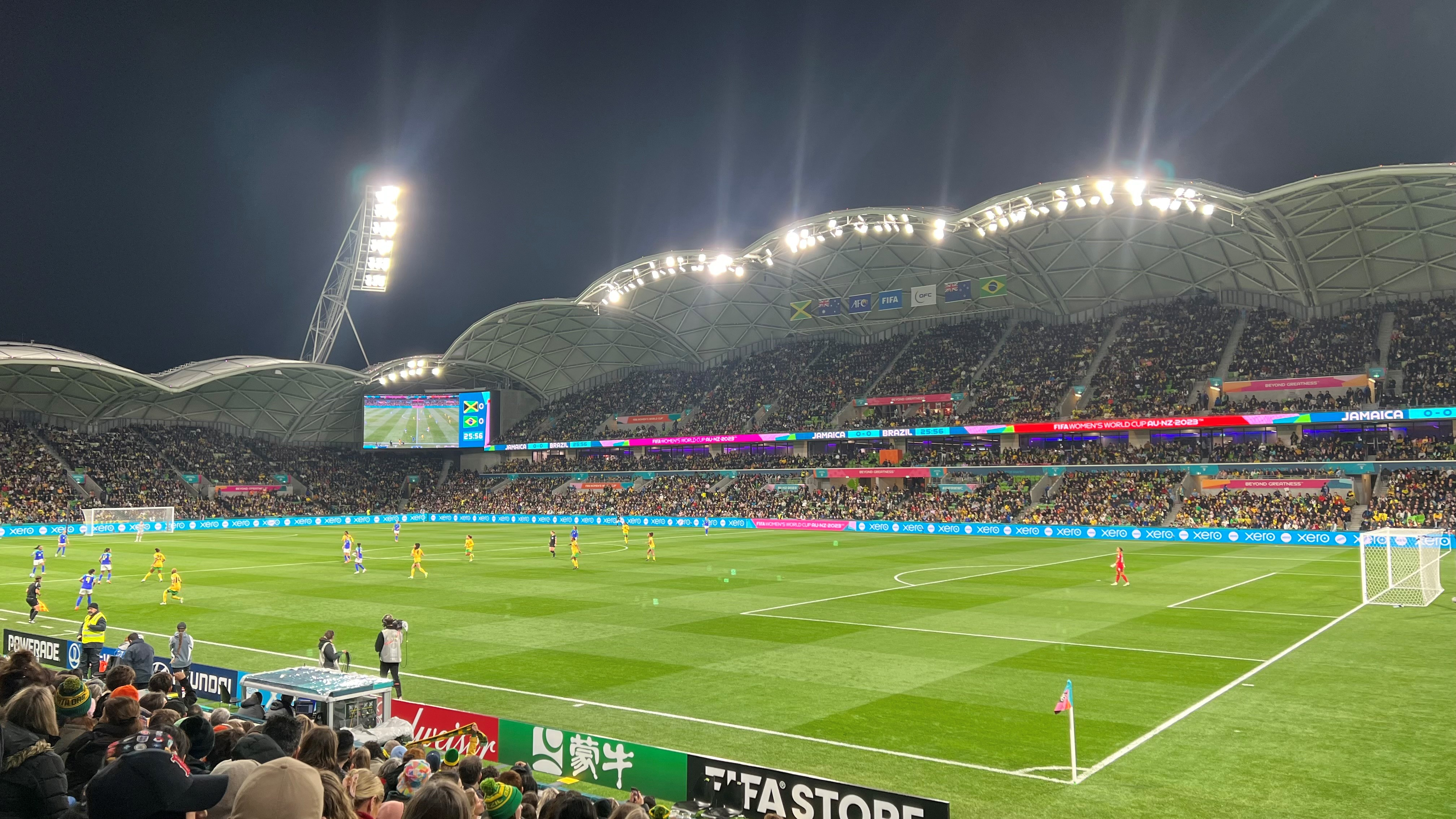
Jamaica versus Brazil during the 2023 FIFA Women's World Cup

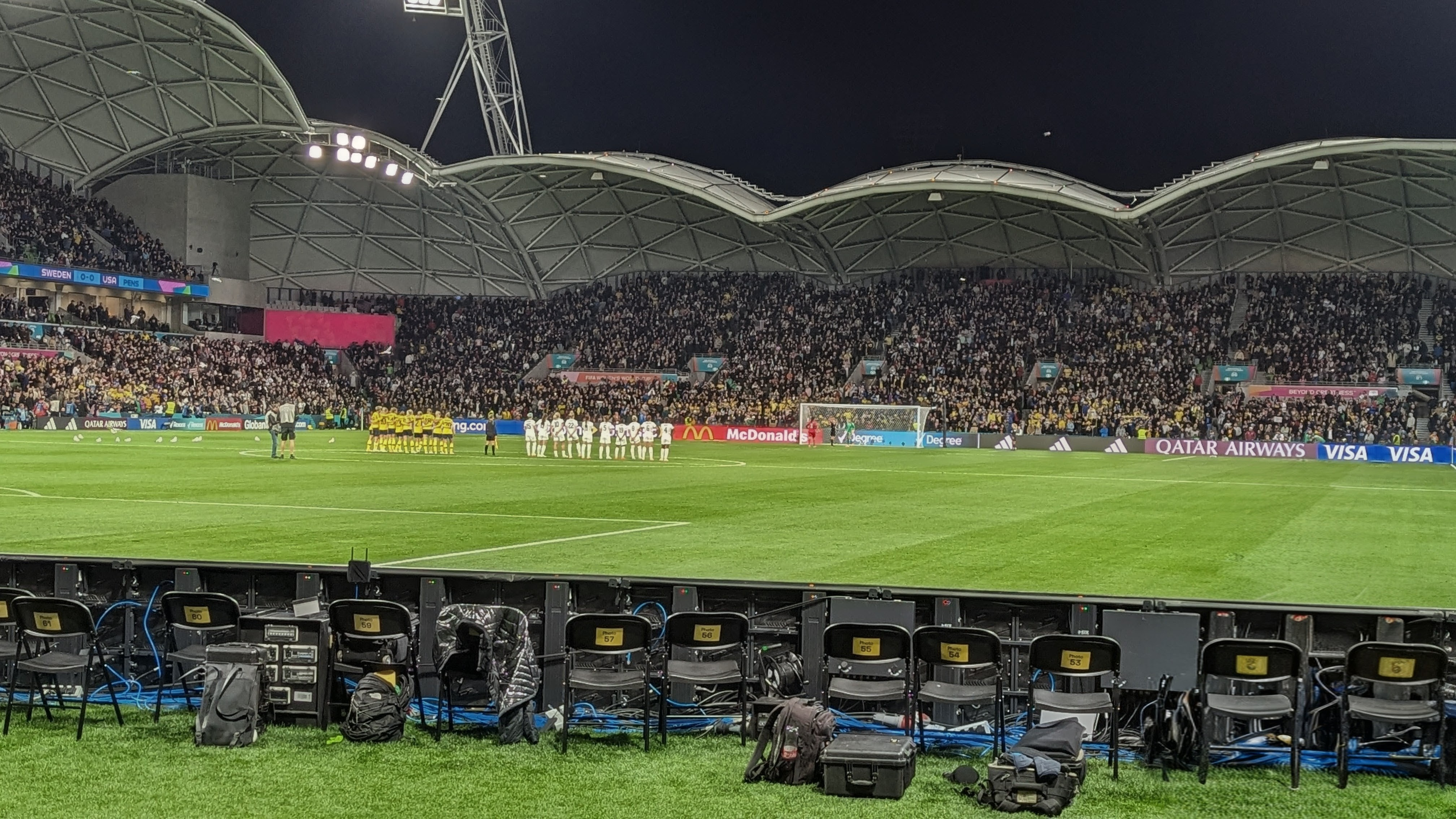
Sweden versus USA during their penalty shootout.

== Awards ==
In 2011 the stadium project was awarded the Australian Institute of Architects (Victorian Chapter) Melbourne Prize for contribution to the civic and public life of Melbourne.

In June 2012 the stadium won the award for the most iconic and culturally significant stadium at the 2012 World Stadium Awards, held in Doha, Qatar.

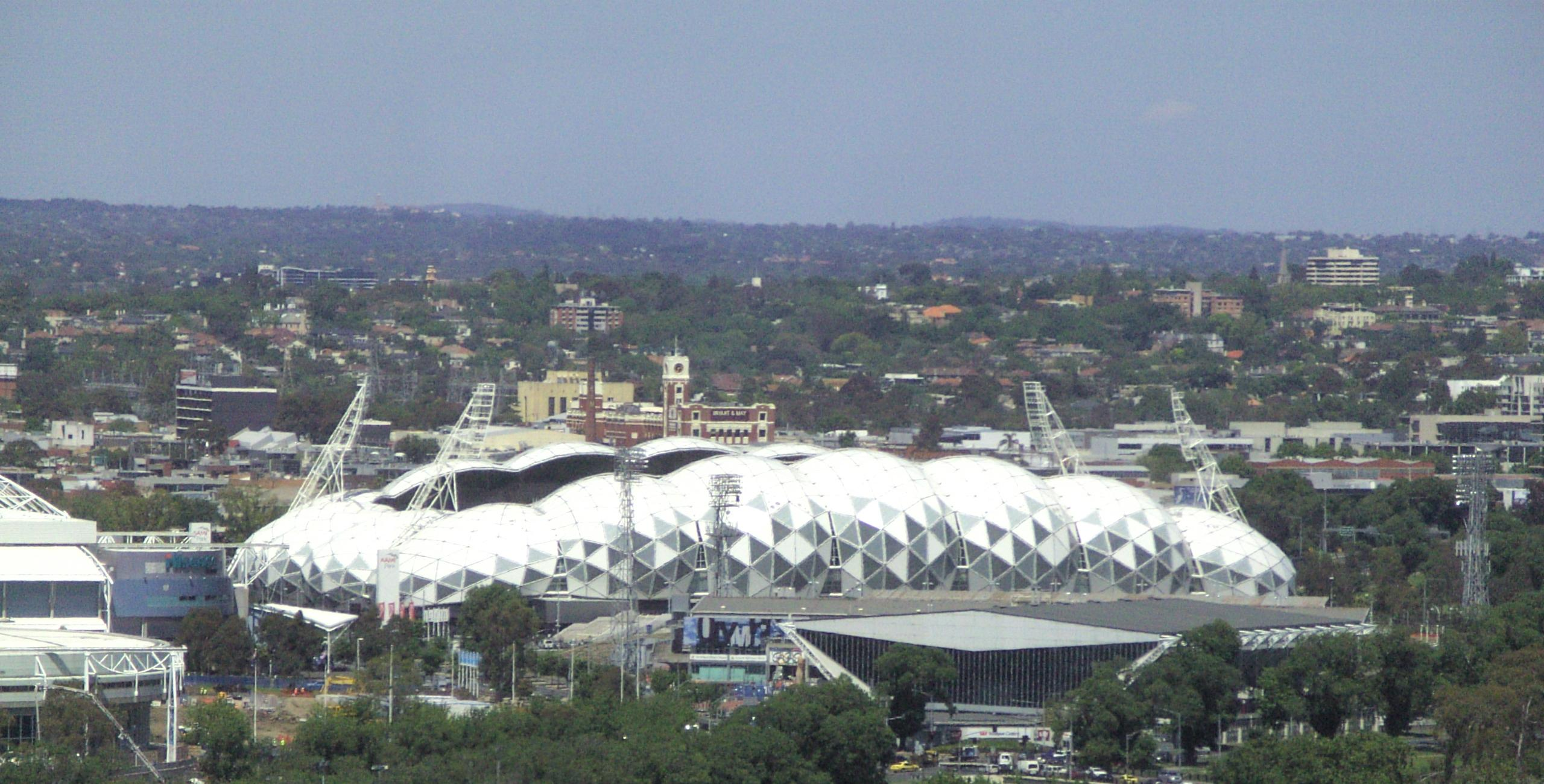
Panoramic view of the Melbourne Rectangular Stadium viewed from a city building.

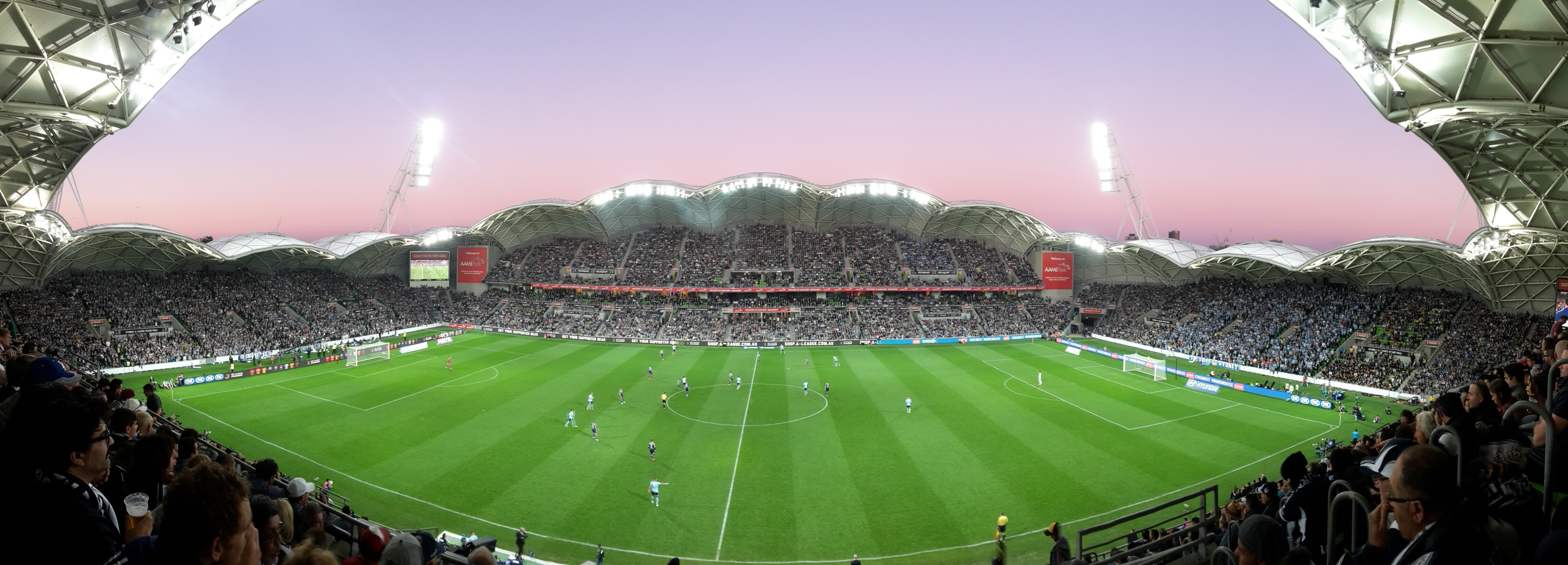
Panorama of Melbourne Rectangular Stadium during the 2015 A-League Grand Final between Melbourne Victory and Sydney FC.

== See also ==
- List of soccer stadiums in Australia
- Lists of stadiums

Preceded by Khalifa International Stadium; Doha	AFC Asian Cup; Opening Venue; 2015	Succeeded by Zayed Sports City Stadium; Abu Dhabi
