= Jo Tong-sop =

North Korean football manager (born 1959)

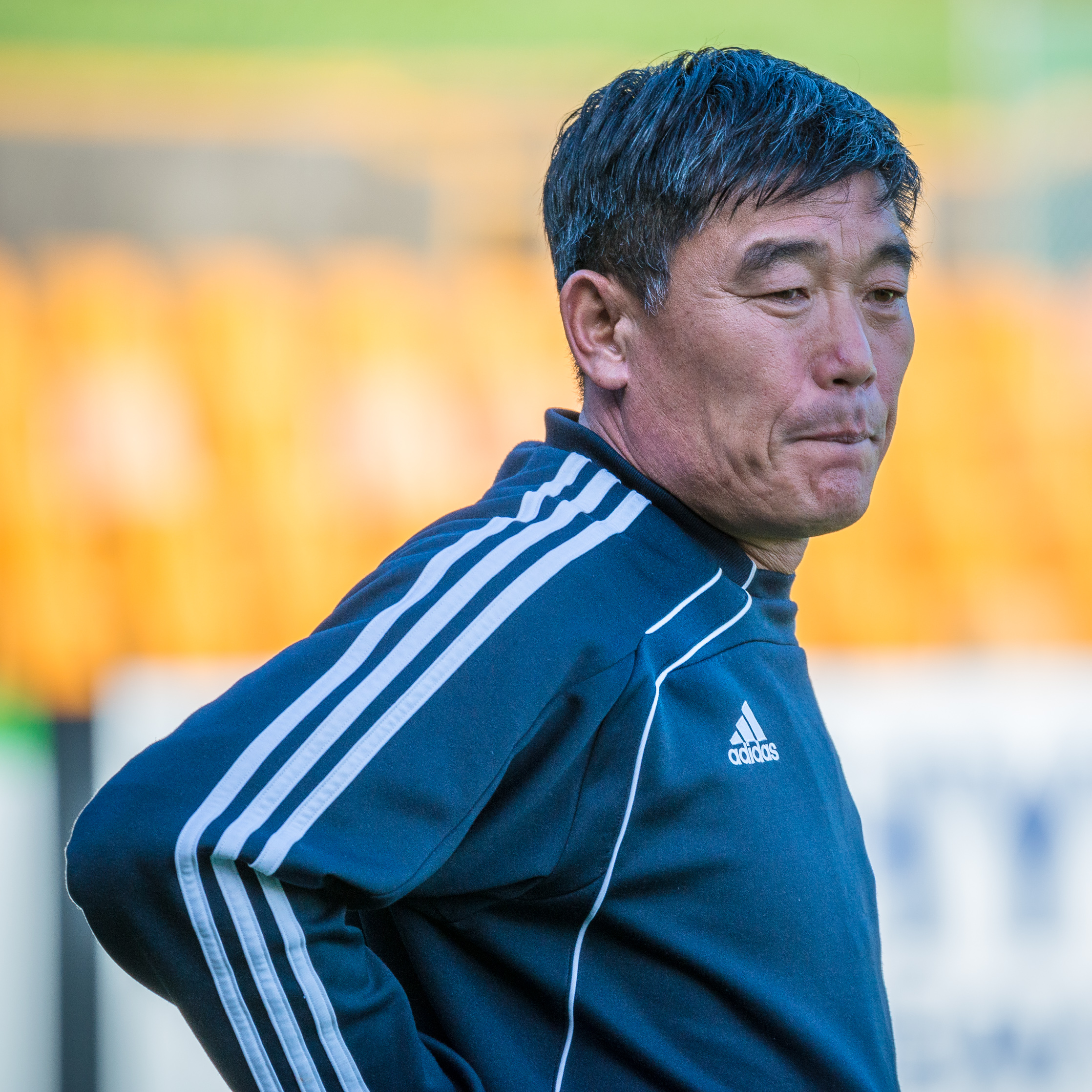

Personal information
- Date of birth: 1 May 1959 (age 67)
- Place of birth: Pyongyang, North Korea

Managerial career
- Years: Team
- 2005: North Korea U17
- 2006–2007: North Korea U20
- 2007: North Korea U23
- 2008–2010: North Korea (assistant)
- 2010–2011: North Korea
- 2014–2015: North Korea
Medal record
Men's football
Representing North Korea (as manager)
AFC Challenge Cup
Bronze medal – third place	2008
Winner	2010

- Jo Tong-sop
- Hangul: 조동섭
- RR: Jo Dongseop
- MR: Cho Tongsŏp

Jo Tong-sop (Korean: 조동섭; born May 1, 1959) is a North Korean football manager and former player. He was most recently the head coach of the North Korea national football team. It was his second stint in charge of the national team, having previously managed North Korea from 2010 to 2011, replacing Kim Jong-hun, who led the team to the 2010 FIFA World Cup.

== Playing career ==
Jo Tong-sop was a player before becoming a coach. He was part of the North Korean team that won the 1986 King's Cup against Aarhus Gymnastikforening. His playing career lasted 20 years.

== Coaching career ==
Jo Tong-sop was the coach of the national youth team and an assistant coach to the 2010 World Cup national team. He led the North Korean national youth team to victory in the 2010 AFC U-19 Championship for their third title. As assistant coach to the national team, he won the 2010 AFC Challenge Cup which let North Korea qualify for the 2011 Asian Cup. During the 2010 AFC Challenge Cup he attributed North Korea's draw to Turkmenistan to the high temperature. His first game as coach of the national team was a loss to Kuwait during a friendly game in Egypt. His first victory with the team was a 1–0 win against Qatar in Doha. He coached the national team during the 2011 Asian Cup, where the first game ended in a draw against the UAE. Later in the cup, North Korea lost to Iran and Iraq. He also led North Korea at the 2015 AFC Asian Cup where they were eliminated again in group stages after three losses against Uzbekistan, Saudi Arabia and China.
