= Bhutan national football team results =

This article lists the results for the Bhutan national football team.

== Key ==
Key to matches

- Att. = Match attendance
- (H) = Home ground
- (A) = Away ground
- (N) = Neutral ground

Key to record by opponent

- Pld = Games played
- W = Games won
- D = Games drawn
- L = Games lost
- GF = Goals for
- GA = Goals against

== Results ==
Bhutan's score is shown first in each case.

Bhutan national football team results
No.	Date	Venue	Opponents	Score	Competition	Bhutan scorers	Att.	Ref.
1	1 April 1982	Dasharath Rangasala, Kathmandu (N)	Nepal	1–3	1982 ANFA Cup	Unknown	—	
2	18 September 1984	Dasharath Rangasala, Kathmandu (N)	Bangladesh	0–2	1984 South Asian Games	—N/a	—	
3	20 September 1984	Dasharath Rangasala, Kathmandu (N)	Nepal	0–5	1984 South Asian Games	—N/a	—	
4	21 September 1984	Dasharath Rangasala, Kathmandu (N)	Maldives	0–1	1984 South Asian Games	—N/a	—	
5	22 December 1985	Dhaka (N)	Nepal	0–1	1985 South Asian Games	—N/a	—	
6	23 December 1985	Dhaka (N)	India	0–3	1985 South Asian Games	—N/a	—	
7	June 1986	Kathmandu (N)	Nepal	0–4	1986 ANFA Cup	—N/a	—	
8	22 November 1987	Calcutta (N)	Bangladesh	0–3	1987 South Asian Games	—N/a	—	
9	23 November 1987	Calcutta (N)	Nepal	2–6	1987 South Asian Games	K. Basnet (2)	—	
10	26 September 1999	Dasharath Rangasala, Kathmandu (N)	Nepal	0–7	1999 South Asian Games	—N/a	—	
11	28 September 1999	Dasharath Rangasala, Kathmandu (N)	India	0–3	1999 South Asian Games	—N/a	—	
12	30 September 1999	Dasharath Rangasala, Kathmandu (N)	Pakistan	1–2	1999 South Asian Games	Chhetri	—	
13	12 February 2000	Kuwait (N)	Nepal	0–3	2000 AFC Asian Cup qualification	—N/a	—	
14	14 February 2000	Kuwait (N)	Kuwait	0–20	2000 AFC Asian Cup qualification	—N/a	—	
15	16 February 2000	Kuwait (N)	Turkmenistan	0–8	2000 AFC Asian Cup qualification	—N/a	—	
16	18 February 2000	Kuwait (N)	Yemen	2–11	2000 AFC Asian Cup qualification	Ogissen, Won Dei	—	
17	28 April 2001	Bangladesh (A)	Bangladesh	1–3	Friendly	Chhetri	—	
18	30 June 2002	Changlimithang Stadium, Thimphu (H)	Montserrat	4–0	Friendly	W. Dorji (3), Chhetri	25,000	
19	27 December 2002	Changlimithang Stadium, Thimphu (H)	Bangladesh	0–1	Friendly	—N/a	—	
20	2 January 2003	Changlimithang Stadium, Thimphu (H)	Bangladesh	0–5	Friendly	—N/a	—	
21	11 January 2003	Bangabandhu National Stadium, Dhaka (N)	Maldives	0–6	2003 SAFF Gold Cup	—N/a	—	
22	13 January 2003	Bangabandhu National Stadium, Dhaka (N)	Nepal	0–2	2003 SAFF Gold Cup	—N/a	25,000	
23	15 January 2003	Bangabandhu National Stadium, Dhaka (N)	Bangladesh	0–3	2003 SAFF Gold Cup	—N/a	15,000	
24	23 April 2003	Changlimithang Stadium, Thimphu (H)	Guam	6–0	2004 AFC Asian Cup qualification	W. Dorji, (2), Chhetri, P. Tshering, Chophel, Nedup	—	
25	27 April 2003	Changlimithang Stadium, Thimphu (H)	Mongolia	0–0	2004 AFC Asian Cup qualification	—N/a	—	
26	6 October 2003	Prince Abdullah Al Faisal Stadium, Jeddah (N)	Indonesia	0–2	2004 AFC Asian Cup qualification	—N/a	—	
27	8 October 2003	Prince Abdullah Al Faisal Stadium, Jeddah (N)	Saudi Arabia	0–6	2004 AFC Asian Cup qualification	—N/a	—	
28	10 October 2003	Prince Abdullah Al Faisal Stadium, Jeddah (N)	Yemen	0–8	2004 AFC Asian Cup qualification	—N/a	—	
29	13 October 2003	Prince Abdullah Al Faisal Stadium, Jeddah (N)	Indonesia	0–2	2004 AFC Asian Cup qualification	—N/a	—	
30	15 October 2003	Prince Abdullah Al Faisal Stadium, Jeddah (N)	Saudi Arabia	0–4	2004 AFC Asian Cup qualification	—N/a	—	
31	17 October 2003	Prince Abdullah Al Faisal Stadium, Jeddah (N)	Yemen	0–4	2004 AFC Asian Cup qualification	—N/a	—	
32	8 December 2005	People's Football Stadium, Karachi (N)	Bangladesh	0–3	2005 SAFF Gold Cup	—N/a	—	
33	10 December 2005	People's Football Stadium, Karachi (N)	India	0–3	2005 SAFF Gold Cup	—N/a	—	
34	12 December 2005	People's Football Stadium, Karachi (N)	Nepal	1–3	2005 SAFF Gold Cup	Pradhan	—	
35	2 April 2006	M. A. Aziz Stadium, Chittagong (N)	Nepal	0–2	2006 AFC Challenge Cup	—N/a	—	
36	4 April 2006	M. A. Aziz Stadium, Chittagong (N)	Sri Lanka	0–1	2006 AFC Challenge Cup	—N/a	—	
37	6 April 2006	M. A. Aziz Stadium, Chittagong (N)	Brunei	0–0	2006 AFC Challenge Cup	—N/a	—	
38	13 May 2008	Barotac Nuevo Plaza Field, Barotac Nuevo (N)	Tajikistan	1–3	2008 AFC Challenge Cup qualification	P. Tshering	5,000	
39	15 May 2008	Barotac Nuevo Plaza Field, Barotac Nuevo (N)	Brunei	1–1	2008 AFC Challenge Cup qualification	Dhendup	4,000	
40	17 May 2008	Iloilo Sports Complex, Iloilo City (N)	Philippines	0–3	2008 AFC Challenge Cup qualification	—N/a	7,000	
41	4 June 2008	Sugathadasa Stadium, Colombo (N)	Bangladesh	1–1	2008 SAFF Championship	Sangay	—	
42	6 June 2008	Sugathadasa Stadium, Colombo (N)	Sri Lanka	0–2	2008 SAFF Championship	—N/a	—	
43	8 June 2008	Sugathadasa Stadium, Colombo (N)	Afghanistan	3–1	2008 SAFF Championship	Y. Dorji, Y. Gyeltshen (2)	—	
44	11 June 2008	National Stadium, Malé (N)	India	1–2 (a.e.t.)	2008 SAFF Championship	K. Dorji	12,000	
45	14 April 2009	National Stadium, Malé (N)	Philippines	0–1	2010 AFC Challenge Cup qualification	—N/a	200	
46	16 April 2009	National Stadium, Malé (N)	Turkmenistan	0–7	2010 AFC Challenge Cup qualification	—N/a	300	
47	18 April 2009	National Stadium, Malé (N)	Maldives	0–5	2010 AFC Challenge Cup qualification	—N/a	9,000	
48	29 November 2009	Salt Lake Stadium, Kolkata (N)	Nepal	1–2	Friendly	P. Tshering	—	
49	4 December 2009	Bangabandhu National Stadium, Dhaka (N)	Bangladesh	1–4	2009 SAFF Championship	Dhendup	—	
50	6 December 2009	Bangabandhu National Stadium, Dhaka (N)	Sri Lanka	0–6	2009 SAFF Championship		—	
51	8 December 2009	Bangabandhu National Stadium, Dhaka (N)	Pakistan	0–7	2009 SAFF Championship	—N/a	—	
52	17 March 2011	Pokhara Rangasala, Pokhara (A)	Nepal	0–1	Friendly	—N/a	—	
53	19 March 2011	Pokhara Rangasala, Pokhara (N)	Nepal	1–2	Friendly	C. Gyeltshen	—	
54	23 March 2011	Tau Devi Lal Stadium, Gurgaon (H) (Note: Bhutan played their home match in qualifying for the 2012 AFC Challenge Cup in Gurgaon, India.)	Afghanistan	0–3	2012 AFC Challenge Cup qualification	—N/a	200	
55	25 March 2011	Tau Devi Lal Stadium, Gurgaon (A)	Afghanistan	0–2	2012 AFC Challenge Cup qualification	—N/a	2,000	
56	3 December 2011	Jawaharlal Nehru Stadium, New Delhi (N)	Sri Lanka	0–3	2011 SAFF Championship	—N/a	—	
57	5 December 2011	Jawaharlal Nehru Stadium, New Delhi (N)	India	0–5	2011 SAFF Championship	—N/a	—	
58	7 December 2011	Jawaharlal Nehru Stadium, New Delhi (N)	Afghanistan	1–8	2011 SAFF Championship	C. Gyeltshen	—	
59	14 November 2012	Thai-Japanese Stadium, Bangkok (A)	Thailand	0–5	Friendly	—N/a	—	
60	2 September 2013	Halchowk Stadium, Kathmandu (N)	Afghanistan	0–3	2013 SAFF Championship	—N/a	—	
61	4 September 2013	Dasharath Rangasala, Kathmandu (N)	Maldives	2–8	2013 SAFF Championship	P. Tshering, C. Gyeltshen	—	
62	6 September 2013	Halchowk Stadium, Kathmandu (N)	Sri Lanka	2–5	2013 SAFF Championship	P. Tshering, Tenzin	—	
63	12 March 2015	Sugathadasa Stadium, Colombo (A)	Sri Lanka	1–0	2018 FIFA World Cup qualification	T. Dorji	3,500	
64	17 March 2015	Changlimithang Stadium, Thimphu (H)	Sri Lanka	2–1	2018 FIFA World Cup qualification	C. Gyeltshen (2)	15,000	
65	11 June 2015	Mong Kok Stadium, Hong Kong (A)	Hong Kong	0–7	2018 FIFA World Cup qualification	—N/a	6,326	
66	16 June 2015	Changlimithang Stadium, Thimphu (H)	China	0–6	2018 FIFA World Cup qualification	—N/a	10,000	
67	20 August 2015	Olympic Stadium, Phnom Penh (A)	Cambodia	0–2	Friendly	—N/a	8,000	
68	3 September 2015	Jassim bin Hamad Stadium, Doha (A)	Qatar	0–15	2018 FIFA World Cup qualification	—N/a	2,022	
69	8 October 2015	Changlimithang Stadium, Thimphu (H)	Maldives	3–4	2018 FIFA World Cup qualification	T. Dorji, C. Gyeltshen, B. Basnet	7,000	
70	13 October 2015	Changlimithang Stadium, Thimphu (H)	Hong Kong	0–1	2018 FIFA World Cup qualification	—N/a	7,280	
71	12 November 2015	Helong Stadium, Changsha (A)	China	0–12	2018 FIFA World Cup qualification	—N/a	27,358	
72	17 November 2015	Changlimithang Stadium, Thimphu (H)	Qatar	0–3	2018 FIFA World Cup qualification	—N/a	4,128	
73	24 December 2015	Trivandrum International Stadium, Thiruvananthapuram (N)	Maldives	1–3	2015 SAFF Championship	T. Dorji	4,000	
74	26 December 2015	Trivandrum International Stadium, Thiruvananthapuram (N)	Afghanistan	0–3	2015 SAFF Championship	—N/a	1,817	
75	28 December 2015	Trivandrum International Stadium, Thiruvananthapuram (N)	Bangladesh	0–3	2015 SAFF Championship	—N/a	218	
76	29 March 2016	National Stadium, Malé (A)	Maldives	2–4	2018 FIFA World Cup qualification	C. Gyeltshen, T. Dorji	4,102	
77	13 August 2016	Changlimithang Stadium, Thimphu (H)	India	0–3	Friendly	—N/a	—	
78	6 September 2016	Bangabandhu National Stadium, Dhaka (A)	Bangladesh	0–0	2019 AFC Asian Cup qualification	—N/a	5,000	
79	10 October 2016	Changlimithang Stadium, Thimphu (H)	Bangladesh	3–1	2019 AFC Asian Cup qualification	J. Dorji, C. Gyeltshen (2)	6,120	
80	28 March 2017	Sultan Qaboos Sports Complex, Muscat (A)	Oman	0–14	2019 AFC Asian Cup qualification	—N/a	4,500	
81	13 June 2017	Changlimithang Stadium, Thimphu (H)	Maldives	0–2	2019 AFC Asian Cup qualification	—N/a	7,600	
82	5 September 2017	Changlimithang Stadium, Thimphu (H)	Palestine	0–2	2019 AFC Asian Cup qualification	—N/a	7,800	
83	10 October 2017	Dura International Stadium, Hebron (A)	Palestine	0–10	2019 AFC Asian Cup qualification	—N/a	7,250	
84	14 November 2017	Changlimithang Stadium, Thimphu (H)	Oman	2–4	2019 AFC Asian Cup qualification	K. S. Tshering, C. Gyeltshen	3,100	
85	27 March 2018	National Stadium, Malé (A)	Maldives	0–7	2019 AFC Asian Cup qualification	—N/a	2,443	
86	1 April 2018	Bukit Jalil National Stadium, Kuala Lumpur (A)	Malaysia	0–7	Friendly	—N/a	—	
87	4 September 2018	Bangabandhu National Stadium, Dhaka (N)	Bangladesh	0–2	2018 SAFF Championship	—N/a	—	
88	6 September 2018	Bangabandhu National Stadium, Dhaka (N)	Nepal	0–4	2018 SAFF Championship	—N/a	—	
89	8 September 2018	Bangabandhu National Stadium, Dhaka (N)	Pakistan	0–3	2018 SAFF Championship	—N/a	—	
90	6 June 2019	Changlimithang Stadium, Thimphu (H)	Guam	1–0	2022 FIFA World Cup qualification	T. Dorji	8,000	
91	11 June 2019	GFA National Training Center, Dededo (A)	Guam	0–5	2022 FIFA World Cup qualification	—N/a	1,029	
92	29 September 2019	Bangabandhu National Stadium, Dhaka (A)	Bangladesh	1–4	Friendly	Dorji	–	
93	3 October 2019	Bangabandhu National Stadium, Dhaka (A)	Bangladesh	0–2	Friendly	—N/a	–	
94	25 March 2023	Dasharath Rangasala, Kathmandu (N)	Laos	1–2	2023 Prime Minister's Three Nations Cup	C. Gyeltshen	500	
95	28 March 2023	Dasharath Rangasala, Kathmandu (N)	Nepal	1–1	2023 Prime Minister's Three Nations Cup	Norbu	6,640	
96	22 June 2023	Sree Kanteerava Stadium, Bangalore (N)	Maldives	0–2	2023 SAFF Championship	—N/a	200	
97	25 June 2023	Sree Kanteerava Stadium, Bangalore (N)	Lebanon	1–4	2023 SAFF Championship	C. Gyeltshen	250	
98	28 June 2023	Sree Kanteerava Stadium, Bangalore (N)	Bangladesh	1–3	2023 SAFF Championship	Dorji	—	
99	6 September 2023	Estádio Campo Desportivo, Macau (A)	Macau	1–0	Friendly	Namgyel	—	
100	12 October 2023	Hong Kong Stadium, Hong Kong (A)	Hong Kong	0–4	2026 FIFA World Cup qualification	—N/a	10,259	
101	17 October 2023	Changlimithang Stadium, Thimphu (H)	Hong Kong	2–0	2026 FIFA World Cup qualification	C. Gyeltshen, Chogyal	5,300	
102	22 March 2024	Colombo Racecourse, Colombo (N)	Central African Republic	0–6	2024 FIFA Series	—N/a	1,100	
103	25 March 2024	Colombo Racecourse, Colombo (A)	Sri Lanka	0–2	2024 FIFA Series		6,320	
104	5 September 2024	Changlimithang Stadium, Thimphu (H)	Bangladesh	0–1	Friendly	—N/a	—	
105	8 September 2024	Changlimithang Stadium, Thimphu (H)	Bangladesh	1–0	Friendly	Wangchuk	—	
106	25 March 2025	Changlimithang Stadium, Thimphu (H)	Yemen	0–0	2027 AFC Asian Cup qualification	Wangchuk	4,700	
107	4 June 2025	National Stadium, Dhaka (A)	Bangladesh	0–2	Friendly	—N/a	17,641	
108	10 June 2025	Hassanal Bolkiah National Stadium, Brunei (H)	Brunei	1–2	2027 AFC Asian Cup qualification	Tshering	3,158	
109	9 October 2025	Grand Hamad Stadium, Doha (N)	Lebanon	0–2	2027 AFC Asian Cup qualification	—N/a	366	
110	14 October 2025	Saoud bin Abdulrahman Stadium (Note: Bhutan were required to play their home matches at a neutral venue, due to the Changlimithang Stadium in Thimphu failing to meet AFC standards.), Qatar (N)	Lebanon	0–4	2027 AFC Asian Cup qualification	—N/a	397	
111	13 November 2025	Padukone-Dravid Centre for Sports Excellence, India (A)	India	1–6	2027 AFC Asian Cup qualification	Jamtsho (?)	0	
112	18 November 2025	Ali Sabah Al-Salem Stadium, Kuwait (N)	Yemen	1–7	2027 AFC Asian Cup qualification	Wangchuk 83'	350	
113	31 March 2026	Indira Gandhi Athletic Stadium, Guwahati (N)	Brunei	2–1	2027 AFC Asian Cup qualification	Gyeltshen 39', 45+1'	549	
114	4 June 2026	Olympic Stadium, Phnom Penh (A)	Cambodia		Friendly			
115	8 June 2026	Bangkok, Thailand (N)	Sri Lanka		Friendly			

== Record by opponent ==
Team	Pld	W	D	L	GF	GA	GD	WPCT
Afghanistan	6	1	0	5	4	20	−16	16.67
Bangladesh	19	3	2	14	10	39	−29	15.79
Brunei	3	1	2	0	3	2	+1	33.33
Cambodia	1	0	0	1	0	2	−2	0.00
Central African Republic	1	0	0	1	0	6	−6	0.00
China	2	0	0	2	0	18	−18	0.00
Guam	3	2	0	1	7	5	+2	66.67
Hong Kong	4	1	0	3	2	12	−10	25.00
India	6	0	1	5	1	18	−17	0.00
Indonesia	2	0	0	2	0	4	−4	0.00
Kuwait	1	0	0	1	0	20	−20	0.00
Laos	1	0	0	1	1	2	−1	0.00
Lebanon	1	0	0	1	1	4	−3	0.00
Macau	1	1	0	0	1	0	+1	100.00
Malaysia	1	0	0	1	0	7	−7	0.00
Maldives	10	0	0	10	8	42	−34	0.00
Mongolia	1	0	1	0	0	0	0	0.00
Montserrat	1	1	0	0	4	0	+4	100.00
Nepal	15	0	1	14	7	46	−39	0.00
Oman	2	0	0	2	2	14	−12	0.00
Pakistan	3	0	0	3	1	12	−11	0.00
Palestine	2	0	0	2	0	12	−12	0.00
Philippines	2	0	0	2	0	4	−4	0.00
Qatar	2	0	0	2	0	18	−18	0.00
Saudi Arabia	2	0	0	2	0	10	−10	0.00
Sri Lanka	8	2	0	6	5	20	−15	25.00
Tajikistan	1	0	0	1	1	3	−2	0.00
Thailand	1	0	0	1	0	5	−5	0.00
Turkmenistan	2	0	0	2	0	15	−15	0.00
Yemen	5	0	2	3	2	23	−21	0.00
Total	109	12	9	88	60	383	−323	11.01

Source: Results
