= Dorji =

Dorji is a Tibetan and Bhutanese given name and surname.

Dorji or Dorjee may also refer to:

== Given name ==
- Dorji Choden (born 1960), Bhutanese politician
- Dorji Dema (born 1983), Bhutanese archer
- Dorjee Khandu (1955–2011), Indian politician
- Dorji Namgyal, Bhutanese politician
- Dorjee Sun (born 1977), social entrepreneur and LGBT rights activist based in Singapore
- Jigme Dorji Wangchuck (1929–1972), Bhutanese monarch
  - Jigme Dorji National Park
- Jigme Dorji Wangchuck (born 1986), Prince of Bhutan
- Dorji Wangchuk (born 1967), Bhutanese Tibetologist
- Dorji Wangdi, Bhutanese politician
- Dorji Wangmo (born 1955), Bhutanese royalty
- Dorji Yangki, Bhutanese architect

== Surname ==
- Ap Chuni Dorji, Bhutanese poet
- Chenkyab Dorji, Bhutanese diplomat
- Chimi Dorji (born 1993), Bhutanese footballer
- Damcho Dorji (born 1965), Bhutanese politician
- Dorji family, a Bhutanese political family
- Hans Dorjee (1941–2002), Dutch football player and manager
- Jigme Palden Dorji (1919–1964), Bhutanese politician, member of the Dorji family
- Jigme Tshering Dorji (born 1995), Bhutanese footballer
- Kazi Lhendup Dorjee (1904–2007), Indian politician
- Kelly Dorji, Bhutanese actor and model
- Kezang Dorji (born 1989), Bhutanese rapper and social worker
- Kinley Dorji, Bhutanese ministry official
- Kinley Dorji (footballer), Bhutanese footballer
- Kinzang Dorji (born 1951), Prime Minister of Bhutan
- Lam Dorji (born 1933), Chief Operations Officer of the Royal Bhutan Army
- Lama Dorji (1728–1753), ruler of the Dzungar Khanate
- Lhendup Dorji (1935–2007), Prime Minister of Bhutan, member of the Dorji family
- Lhendup Dorji (footballer), Bhutanese footballer
- Mayeum Choying Wangmo Dorji, Bhutanese royalty
- Nim Dorjee Tamang (born 1995), Indian footballer
- Pasang Dorjee Sona, Indian politician
- Pawo Choyning Dorji (born 1983), Bhutanese filmmaker and photographer
- Pem Dorjee Sherpa (born 1982), Nepalese Sherpa mountaineer
- Pema Dorji (doctor) (1936–2009), Bhutanese doctor
- Pema Dorji (footballer) (born 1985), Bhutanese football manager
- Phu Dorjee, Indian sherpa
- Rinzin Dorji (athlete) (born 1976), Bhutanese runner
- Sonam Topgay Dorji (1896–1953), Prime Minister of Bhutan, member of the Dorji family
- Tenzin Dorji (1997), Bhutanese footballer
- Thinley Dorji (footballer) (born 1995), Bhutanese footballer
- Thinley Dorji (archer) (born 1950), Bhutanese archer
- Tsering Dorjee, Tibetan stage and film actor, singer, dancer and musician
- Tshering Dorji (born 1993), Bhutanese footballer
- Tseten Dorjee (born 1960), Tibetan painter
- Tsewang Dorji Namjal (1732–1750), ruler of the Dzungar Khanate
- Ugyen Dorji (1855–1916), Prime Minister of Bhutan, member of the Dorji family
- Ugyen Dorji (footballer), Bhutanese footballer
- Wangay Dorji (born 1974), Bhutanese football player
- Yeshe Dorjee Thongchi (born 1952), Indian writer
- Yeshey Dorji (born 1989), Bhutanese footballer
