= Pema Dorji =

Pema Dorji may refer to:

- Pema Dorji (doctor) (1936–2009), first person to institutionalize traditional medicine in Bhutan
- Pema Dorji (footballer) b. 1985, Bhutanese football manager

== See also ==
- Dorji
