= Public Works Department FC =

Bhutanese football club

Public Works Department
- Full name: Public Works Department Football Club
- Dissolved: 1995; 31 years ago
- Ground: Changlimithang; Thimphu, Bhutan
- Capacity: 45,000
- League: Bhutan A-Division
- 1986: 5th

Public Works Department Football Club was a football club from Bhutan, based at Changlimithang, who played in the inaugural Bhutan A-Division, then the top level of football in Bhutan, but since replaced by a full national league.

== History ==
They finished fifth in the inaugural season, winning three and drawing two of their nine games. They achieved victories over Education and Yangchengphug College 2–1 and 2–0 respectively, whilst drawing with Health School and Motithang College 0–0 and T. I. and Power 3–3. There are no records available for any competitions held between 1987 and 1995, so it is not known whether they competed again, and there is no record of them competing in any future season for which records exist.
