= 2001 Bhutan A-Division =

A-Division (Bhutan)
- Season: 2001
- Champions: Druk Star
- Matches played: 10
- Goals scored: 28 (2.8 per match)
- Biggest home win: Thimphu 4-0 Druk Pol
- Biggest away win: Paro 0-6 Thimphu
- Highest scoring: Paro 0-6 Thimphu
- Longest winning run: 4 - Druk Star
- Longest unbeaten run: 4 - Druk Star
- Longest losing run: 2 - Paro, Gomtu

The 2001 season of the Bhutanese A-Division was the seventh recorded season of top-flight football in Bhutan. The league was won by Druk Star, their first title and the first time a Bhutanese team other than Druk Pol had won in the last six years. The league was preceded by a qualifying tournament known as the Thimphu League. Qualifiers from this league joined other teams in a round robin group stage to determine the four teams who would proceed to the knock out stage.

== Thimphu League ==
The 2001 Thimphu League, which started on 15 July, served as a qualifying tournament for the 2001 Bhutan A-Division. 9 teams took part, 5 from Thimphu and 4 from Phuentsholing. It is not known for certain how many teams qualified, but of the four known participants, three qualified as a result of their position.

=== Known participating teams ===
From Thimphu:

- Druk Pol
- Druk Stars
- Thimphu

From Paro:

- Paro

=== Known result ===
Unknown

Paro	Beat	Druk Stars
Unknown	Source	Unknown

Druk Stars did not qualify for the A-Division.

== A-Division ==
The A-division commenced on 12 August. Although Druk Star had not qualified via the Thimphu League earlier in the year, they were given a place following the withdrawal of Phuentsholing and Chhuka. The league consisted of two groups of three teams playing in a round robin format. The top two teams from each group then qualified for the semi-final knockout stages.

=== Participating teams ===
Location of teams participating in the 2012-13 Bhutan National League.

From Thimphu:

- Druk Pol
- Druk Star
- Thimphu

From outside Thimphu:

- Chhukha (withdrew)
- Gomtu
- Paro
- Phuentsholing (withdrew)
- Samtse

=== Group A ===
Pos	Team	Pld	W	D	L	GF	GA	GD	Pts	Qualification
1	Thimphu (Q)	2	1	1	0	6	0	+6	4	Qualification for Semi-Finals
2	Druk Pol (Q)	2	1	1	0	2	0	+2	4	Qualification for Semi-Finals
3	Paro	2	0	0	2	0	8	−8	0	

Updated to match(es) played on 2 Nov 2012. Source:
Rules for classification: 1) points; 2) goal difference; 3) number of goals scored.
(Q) Qualified for the phase indicated

==== Results ====
12 August 2001

Thimphu	0-0	Druk Pol
Unknown	Source	Unknown

13 August 2001

Paro	0-2	Druk Pol
Unknown	Source	Unknown

14 August 2001

Paro	0-6	Thimphu
Unknown	Source	Unknown

=== Group B ===
Pos	Team	Pld	W	D	L	GF	GA	GD	Pts	Qualification
1	Druk Star (Q)	2	2	0	0	7	1	+6	6	Qualification for Semi-Finals
2	Samtse (Q)	2	1	0	1	2	2	0	3	Qualification for Semi-Finals
3	Gomtu	2	0	0	2	0	6	−6	0	

Updated to match(es) played on 2 Nov 2012. Source:
Rules for classification: 1) points; 2) goal difference; 3) number of goals scored.
(Q) Qualified for the phase indicated

==== Results ====
12 August 2001

Samtse	1-0	Gomtu
Unknown	Source	Unknown

13 August 2001

Gomtu	0-5	Druk Star
Unknown	Source	Unknown

14 August 2001

Druk Star	2-1	Samtse
Unknown	Source	Unknown

=== Semi finals ===
16 August 2001

Samtse	2-1	Thimphu
Bullet 21'; Wangay Dorji 28'	Source	Ugyen Wangchuk 35'

17 August 2001

Druk Star	1-0	Druk Pol
Dorji 21'	Source

=== Third-place match ===
18 August 2001

Thimphu	4-0	Druk Pol
Sonam Jamtsho 11'; Ugyen Dorji 25'; Deo Kumar 53'; Kinley Dorji 68'	Source

=== Final ===
19 August 2001

Druk Star	3-0	Samtse
Karma Jambayang 10'; Jigme Tobgay 68'; Sonam Gyeltshen 81'	Source

Changlimithang Stadium, Thimphu
