= Finance FC =

Bhutanese football club

Finance
- Full name: Finance Football Club
- Founded: 1986; 40 years ago
- Dissolved: 1995; 31 years ago
- Ground: Changlimithang; Thimphu, Bhutan
- Capacity: 15,000
- League: Bhutan A-Division
- 1986: 3rd

Finance Football Club was a football club from Bhutan, based at Changlimithang, who played in the inaugural Bhutan A-Division, then the top level of football in Bhutan, but since replaced by a full national league.

== History ==
They finished third in the inaugural season, losing two games, to eventual winners Royal Bhutan Army and Social Service. they were the top scorers in the 1986 season with 25 goals. There are no records available for any competitions held between 1987 and 1995 so it is not known whether they competed again, and there is no record of them competing in any future season for which records exist.
