= Harez Habib =

Afghan footballer

Personal information
- Full name: Harez Arian Habib
- Date of birth: 20 February 1982 (age 44)
- Place of birth: Kabul, Afghanistan
- Position: Midfielder

Team information
- Current team: KSV Klein-Karben

Youth career
- 1986–1998: FSV Wacker 90 Nordhausen
- 1998–2000: GSV Eintracht Baunatal

Senior career*
Years	Team	Apps	(Gls)
2000–2001	SpVgg Olympia Kassel		
2001–2003	GSV Eintracht Baunatal		
2003–2004	KSV Baunatal II		
2004–2007	VfL Kassel		
2007–2008	FSC Lohfelden	31	(6)
2008–2010	KSV Hessen Kassel	57	(5)
2010–2012	KSV Hessen Kassel II	51	(48)
2012–2013	BC Sport Kassel		
2014	SpVgg Oberradl		
2014–	KSV Klein-Karben		

International career
2007–	Afghanistan	13	(4)
- * Club domestic league appearances and goals

Harez Arian Habib (Persian: هارز آریان حبیب; born 20 February 1982, in Kabul) is an Afghan footballer who plays as a midfielder for KSV Klein-Karben.

== Club career stats ==
Last update: 10 September 2011

Club performance			League		Cup		League Cup		Continental		Total	
Season	Club	League	Apps	Goals	Apps	Goals	Apps	Goals	Apps	Goals	Apps	Goals
Germany			League		DFB-Pokal		Other		Europe		Total	
2000–01	SpVgg Olympia Kassel	Gruppenliga Hessen-Kassel Gruppe 2					-		-			
2001–02	GSV Eintracht Baunatal	Landesliga Hessen-Nord					-		-			
2002–03	GSV Eintracht Baunatal	Landesliga Hessen-Nord					-		-			
2003–04	KSV Baunatal II	Landesliga Hessen-Nord					-		-			
2004–05	VfL Kassel	Landesliga Hessen-Nord					-		-			
2005–06	VfL Kassel	Landesliga Hessen-Nord					-		-			
2006–07	VfL Kassel	Landesliga Hessen-Nord					-		-			
2007–08	FSC Lohfelden	Oberliga Hessen	31	6			-		-			
2008–09	KSV Hessen Kassel	Regionalliga Süd	28	5	0	0	-		-			
2009–10	KSV Hessen Kassel	Regionalliga Süd	29	0			-		-			
2010–11	KSV Hessen Kassel II	Verbandsliga Hessen-Nord			-		-		-			
2011–12	KSV Hessen Kassel II	Verbandsliga Hessen-Nord			-		-		-			
2012–13	BC Sport Kassel	Gruppenliga Hessen-Kassel Gruppe 2			-		-		-			
Total	Country						0	0	0	0		
Career total							0	0	0	0		

== International career ==
Habib plays in midfield and scored his first two national team goals for Afghanistan in 2008 SAFF Championship opener against the Hosts Sri Lanka, he scored one goal each against Bangladesh and Bhutan to be the top scorers in the tournament.

=== International goals ===
Date	Venue	Opponent	Result	Competition	Goals
2008-06-04	Colombo, Sri Lanka	Sri Lanka	2–2	2008 SAFF Championship	2
2008-06-06	Colombo, Sri Lanka	Bangladesh	2–2	2008 SAFF Championship	1
2008-06-08	Colombo, Sri Lanka	Bhutan	1–3	2008 SAFF Championship	1
