= Health School FC =

Bhutanese football club

Health School (RIHS FC)
- Full name: Health School Football Club
- Founded: 1977; 49 years ago
- Ground: Changlimithang; Thimphu, Bhutan
- Capacity: 15,000
- League: Bhutan A-Division
- 1986: 7th

Health School Football Club, sometimes referred to as RIHS FC, is a football club from Bhutan, based at Changlimithang. Founded in 1977, who played in the inaugural Bhutan A-Division, then the top level of football in Bhutan, but since replaced by a full national league. Since 2006, they have been performing under the name RIHS FC.

== History ==
They finished seventh in the inaugural season, winning two and drawing two of their nine matches. They achieved victories over Motithang and Yangchengphug colleges 2–1 and 1–0 respectively, whilst drawing 0–0 with Public Works Department and 1–1 with Education. The club still exists and plays its matches, but in the lower Bhutanese leagues.
