= RIHS =

RIHS may stand for:

- Reading Intermediate High School, a school in Reading, Pennsylvania
- Rhode Island Historical Society, an organization dedicated to the history of Rhode Island
- Rock Island High School, a high school in Rock Island, Illinois
- Society of the Revival of Islamic Heritage, a Kuwait-based non-governmental organization
- RIHS F.C., a former association football Bhutanese club
