= Motithang College FC =

Bhutanese football club

Motithang College
- Full name: Motithang College Football Club
- Founded: 1986; 40 years ago
- Dissolved: 2005; 21 years ago
- Ground: Changlimithang; Thimphu, Bhutan
- Capacity: 45,000
- League: Bhutan A-Division
- 1986: 6th

Motithang College Football Club was a football club from Bhutan, based at Changlimithang, who played in the inaugural Bhutan A-Division. The club was dissolved in 2005, splitting into two other teams: Motithang United FC, founded immediately after the split in 2005, and Motithang City FC, founded in 2014..

== History ==
They finished sixth in the inaugural season, winning two and drawing two of their nine games. They achieved victories over Education and T. I. and Power 1–0 whilst drawing with Public Works Department 0–0 and Yangchengphug College 1–1. They were somewhat lacklustre in attack, scoring only six goals throughout the entire season, only the bottom two clubs Education and Yangchengphug scored fewer. In the following years, the club competed in the lower leagues of Bhutan, but it was dissolved in 2005, splitting into two other teams: Motithang United and Motithang City.
