= Chokey Nima =

Bhutanese football player

Personal information
- Full name: Chokey Nima
- Date of birth: 10 October 1975 (age 51)

Senior career*
Years	Team	Apps	(Gls)
1990 - 2001	Phuensym FC	10	(52)

International career^{‡}
1994 - 1997	Bhutan		

Managerial career
- 2015: Bhutan
- * Club domestic league appearances and goals ‡ National team caps and goals as of 13 March 2015

Chokey Nima (born 10 October 1975) is a former Bhutanese footballer and also was the head coach the Bhutan national football team. He played for the national team for 12 years.

Chokey Nima led Bhutan in the first round of the AFC qualifiers of the 2018 FIFA World Cup. Bhutan had to face Sri Lanka in a two-legged match to determine which team would advance to the second round. Nima won both matches against Sri Lanka. He would not coach the national team at the second round of the qualifiers as he was only head coach in an interim capacity. Japanese coach, Norio Tsukitate succeeded him as head coach of the national team.

== Statistics ==
=== Managerial ===
As of 12 March 2015.

Nat	Team	from	to	Record				
Nat	Team	from	to	Games	Wins	Draws	Losses	Win %
(Bhutan)	Bhutan	March 2015		2	2	0	0	100.00
Total				2	2	0	0	100.00
