= RIHS FC =

Bhutanese football club

RIHS
- Full name: Royal Institute of Health and Sciences Football Club
- Founded: 1977; 49 years ago
- Ground: Changlimithang; Thimphu, Bhutan
- Capacity: 45,000
- League: Bhutan A-Division
- 2007: 7th

RIHS Football Club is a football club from Bhutan, based at Changlimithang, who played in the Bhutan A-Division, then the top level of football in Bhutan, but since replaced by a full national league. Founded in 1977 as Health School FC, they spent two seasons in the top flight of Bhutanese football before being relegated following a season that included the record defeat for a football team in Bhutan.

== History ==
Royal Institute of Health and Sciences Football Club was founded in 1977. The first recorded instance of RIHS playing in the top flight of Bhutanese football was in 2006. Details are lacking for this season and their final position is not known. The only result that is known is a 4–1 loss to Yeedzin. It is also not known how they came to be in the A-Division for that season. They were not involved in the final of the B-Division for 2005, which was contested between Choden and Rookies, so were presumably not involved in the promotion playoffs that followed. They finished seventh in the 2007 season and were relegated. The league table for the 2007 season is incomplete and only a handful of results are known. However, there are a number of results which are notable due to their high scores, both involving very heavy defeats for the Royal Institute of Health and Sciences team:

24 July 2007

Yeedzin	15–0	RIHS
	Source

Note: RIHS only fielded 9 players.

3 August 2007

RIHS	0–20	Transport United
	Source	Tshering x17 (seventeen goals); Dorji; Dorji; Dhendup

In the game between Transport United and RIHS FC, Passang Tshering scored seventeen goals. Sources indicate that the most goals scored by a single player in a game was 16, scored by Panagiotis Pontikos of Olympos Xylofagou against SEK Ayios Athanasios in May 2007 and by Stephane Stanis for RC Strasbourg in the 1940s. It would appear therefore, that Pontikos, having equalled a record that had stood for over 60 years, saw it broken only a few days later.

The club still exists and plays its matches, but in the lower Bhutanese leagues.
