= Bhutan national football team =

Men's national association football team representing Bhutan

Bhutan
- Nickname(s): དྲག་པོའི་བུ་ཚུ (Dragon Boys)
- Association: Bhutan Football Federation (BFF)
- Confederation: AFC (Asia)
- Sub-confederation: SAFF (South Asia)
- Head coach: Gary Phillips
- Captain: Chencho Gyeltshen
- Most caps: Chencho Gyeltshen (49)
- Top scorer: Chencho Gyeltshen (15)
- Home stadium: Changlimithang Stadium
- FIFA code: BHU
First colours	Second colours

FIFA ranking
- Current: 192 (7 October 2026)
- Highest: 159 (June 2015)
- Lowest: 209 (November 2014 – March 2015)

First international
- Unofficial: Nepal 3–1 Bhutan (Kathmandu, Nepal; 1 April 1982); Official: Bhutan 0–3 Nepal (Kuwait City, Kuwait; 2 February 2000)

Biggest win
- Bhutan 6–0 Guam (Thimphu, Bhutan; 23 April 2003)

Biggest defeat
- Kuwait 20–0 Bhutan (Kuwait City, Kuwait; 14 February 2000)

SAFF Championship
- Appearances: 10 (first in 2003)
- Best result: Semi-finals (2008, 2026)

AFC Challenge Cup
- Appearances: 1 (first in 2006)
- Best result: Group stage (2006)

The Bhutan national football team (Dzongkha: འབྲུག་གི་རྒྱལ་ཡོངས་རྐང་རྩེད་སྡེ་ཚན) represents Bhutan in men's international football. The team is controlled by the governing body for football in Bhutan, the Bhutan Football Federation, which is a member of the Asian Football Federation and the regional South Asian Football Federation (SAFF). The team plays its home games at the Changlimithang Stadium in the capital Thimphu.

The side has consistently been ranked as one of the worst national teams in the world on both the official FIFA rankings and the Elo rating system. As of the end of November 2017, they have only won six competitive fixtures and have a goal difference of −279. The team have never qualified for a major tournament and, beyond friendlies and qualifying matches, their only participation in an official competition has been in the regional South Asian Games and the South Asian Football Federation Cup.

== History ==
=== Beginning (1950s–1980s) ===
There is uncertainty around how football was ultimately brought to Bhutan. During the colonial period in Bhutan, although it had signed treaties with the government of India which ceded control of its defence and foreign relations to the British, continued to function as an independent state and was never under the direct rule of the British government in India. Whereas Indians were introduced to football by the British government, the lack of a permanent British presence in Bhutan meant that foreign sports were not played there. The arrival of football in Bhutan was very closely linked with the opening of schools in Haa and Paro in the 1950s, as foreign teachers, mainly from India but some from Europe, were recruited. The Bhutan Football Federation note that in the beginning there was little in the way of formal facilities or equipment and the game was played on stone-covered pitches with a ball made from a bundle of clothes. The game continued to grow as more Bhutanese went abroad, mainly to India, to study and helped increase the popularity of the sport upon their return, though the game was still considered to be just that and was not really developed during this period.

The main centers for football during the 1960s were Phuentsholing and Samtse, close to the border with India, where hastily arranged teams would travel back and forth over the border to play neighboring tea gardens. In 1968, a team nominally representing Bhutan, but essentially consisting of foreign players, traveled to Calcutta to compete in the Indian Independence Cup. Over time, football gradually increased in popularity until it was seen as an essential part of the school curriculum, with numerous school tournaments established within Thimphu. Teams used to travel from all over the country to take part, some coming from as far away as Khaling. However, regardless of the popularity of the game amongst the Bhutanese, the notion of a Bhutan "national team" consisting almost entirely of foreigners persisted for some time, and this team would regularly travel abroad to take part in international competitions such as the ANFA Cup, with a team consisting of around 60% Indian players. These Indian players were brought to Bhutan and given jobs within the Civil Service, although essentially their role was to play football.

In the late 1970s and early 1980, as well as playing several matches in Bhutan, the representative team, known as Druk 11, also played a number of games outside the country in Nepal and India, against representative teams such as the Food Corporation of India. At that time, eight out of the eleven members of the team were from India. Such a situation could not last, however, and in time these players either retired or returned to their home country creating a vacuum of talent which would seriously affect the national team in the years to come.

Given that the first international competition had been taking place since 1872, Bhutan's official entry into the international arena was comparatively late, playing their first match only in 1982, a 3–1 loss to Nepal in the 1982 ANFA Cup. However, other sources also indicate that a team representing Bhutan travelled to Nepal eight years earlier and won a tournament known as the Shripanch Mahendra Gold Cup, though it is not clear the extent to which this was a true international tournament or whether they were competing against club teams. They also played a representative team from China's Kunming Army Unit in the competition, also losing 3–1. Unfortunately, the scorers for Bhutan are not recorded, so it is unknown who scored Bhutan's first international goal. Bhutan's involvement in the ANFA Cup came some seven years before the inauguration of their own league competition. Again however, sources are contradictory with some indicating that a tournament that at least shared the name "A-League" was established in Thimphu sometime around the beginning of the 1980s.

Despite the at best fledgling nature of their domestic competition at that time, Bhutan continued to put out a side, this time in the South Asian Games. They entered the first games in 1984, but lost all three of their games, 2–0 to Bangladesh, 5–0 to hosts and eventual winners Nepal and 1–0 to the Maldives to finish last out of the four competing teams. It is unclear whether a play-off for third place was held between Bhutan and the Maldives. If it was, then the result is not known. Either way, the bronze medal was awarded to the Maldives.

Undeterred, Bhutan sent a team to the following year's competition in Bangladesh. Results went the same way as the prior year's tournament. Bhutan were drawn in group B of the competition along with India and Nepal. They lost their first match narrowly, 1–0 to Nepal and were beaten 3–0 by eventual champions India to ensure that they finished bottom of the group and did not progress.

The national team did not play any fixtures for the next two years as the South Asian Games moved to become a biennial competition, though they again sent a team to the third edition of the games in Kolkata, India. Drawn in group B again, this time with Nepal and Bangladesh, history repeated itself, as Bhutan lost first to Bangladesh 3–0, with Badal Das, Khurshid Alam Babul and Ahmed Ali scoring for Bangladesh, and then 6–2 to Nepal. Whilst their two goals ended a five-year, six-game scoring drought, they were thoroughly outclassed as Ganesh Thapa scored five times for Nepal.

=== Stagnation (1990s–2000s) ===
Despite establishing the first recorded football league in Bhutan in 1986, and while the Bhutan Football Federation was admitted as member of the AFC in 1994, the national team did not compete in any matches following their defeat to Nepal in the South Asian Games until 1999, missing four editions of the Games, returning only in 1999.

Their absence from the international arena had not seen an improvement in the standard of their football, even though there had been a national championship established in the country for the previous four seasons. Their first game against hosts Nepal ended in a resounding 7–0 defeat. The team found themselves 3–0 down within the first twenty minutes as Hari Khadka scored in the first and fifth minutes, with Naresh Joshi extending the lead after eighteen. Bhutan were able to keep Nepal at bay for the rest of the half, but conceded two more either side of the hour mark courtesy of Deepak Amatya and Rajan Rayamajhi before a brace from Basanta Thapa sealed an emphatic victory for Nepal. They performed better defensively in their next match, but still lost 3–0 to India, Vijayam Imivalappil scoring all three goals for India. Out of the competition, Bhutan faced a dead-rubber against Pakistan, who were also eliminate prior to the fixture following losses to India and Nepal. With nothing to play for, they produced their best performance of the tournament. Dinesh Chhetri opened the scoring for Bhutan in the twenty-first minute, the first time they had led a game in their history, only to see a potential victory disappear following two-second-half goals for Pakistan from Haroon Yousaf.

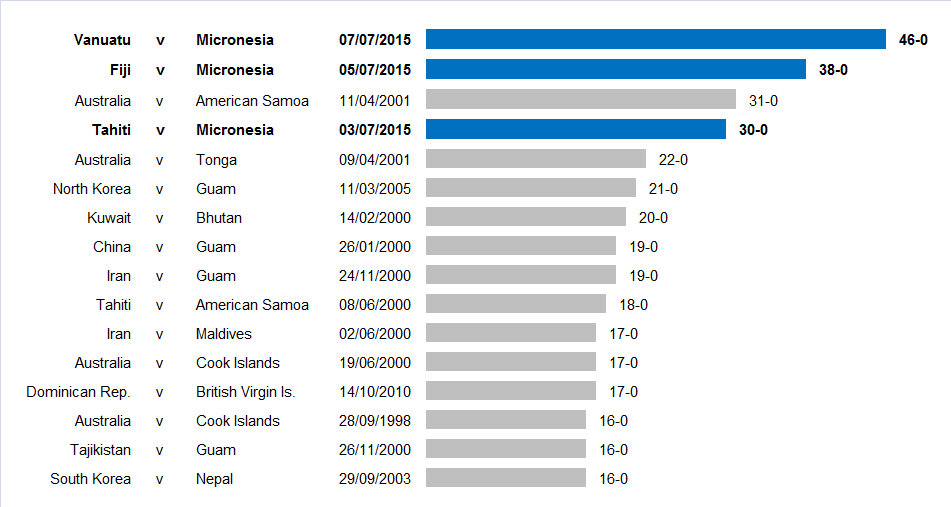
A bar chart contextualising Bhutan's defeat against Kuwait amidst the largest margins of victory in international football since 1997. (Note: The blue bars highlight the Federated States of Micronesia national under-23 football team's performance in the 2015 Pacific Games; as of June 2016, the worst performance by any national representative team at an official tournament.)

At the turn of the century, having spent the best part of the last two decades competing only against teams within South Asia, Bhutan made their first foray into international football at a continental level, competing in the qualification rounds for the 2000 AFC Asian Cup. This tournament was to be one of the lowest points in the history of the admittedly hastily assembled national team. An opening 3–0 loss to Nepal was perhaps not surprising, with Bhutan never having gained any form of positive result against their Himalayan neighbours, and at this point in time having scored against them only once in the ANFA Cup back in 1982. Four days later they faced Kuwait and were beaten 20–0. Seven of the ten Kuwaiti outfield players got their names on the scoresheet that day, including Bashar Abdullah who scored eight and Jassem Al-Houwaidi who scored five. Bhutan were seriously hampered in this game by their years in the footballing wilderness, but did not help themselves in the match conceding four penalties in total for what were described as "rugby-like challenges" and having two players sent off. This defeat was a world record international defeat, though this most undesirable of records was only held for fourteen months when Australia beat Tonga 22–0. As of 2016 this remains their worst ever result. Further heavy defeats were to follow, an 8–0 loss to Turkmenistan was followed by an 11–2 defeat to Yemen. Following this qualifying tournament, having been established in 1983, the Bhutan Football Federation was admitted as the 204th member of FIFA.

=== The Other final (2002) ===
Their defeats in 2000 in AFC Cup qualifying had left Bhutan ranked as the world's second worst national team with thirteen points in the official FIFA rankings, sandwiched between American Samoa above and Montserrat below. At this time, following the Netherlands failure to qualify for the 2002 FIFA World Cup, two Dutch ad-agency partners, Johan Kramer and Matthijs de Jongh, not having their home team to cheer on, pondered who the worst team in the world might be. With Bhutan and Montserrat so close to each other at the bottom of the FIFA rankings, they set out to arrange a match between the two nations. Montserrat, with their only pitch having been destroyed by one of the island nation's seven active volcanoes, agreed to the match and travelled to Bhutan for the game, held at Changlimithang a few hours before the 2002 FIFA World Cup final, a match authorised by FIFA. The game started strongly for Montserrat and Bhutan struggled to contain them during early exchanges. However, initial nerves were settled after five minutes when Wangay Dorji headed a goal to give Bhutan the lead. This gave them the momentum to press on, but their finishing was lax and they were unable to convert the chances they created. Montserrat were able to keep Bhutan at bay for the rest of the half and the game remained at 1–0 until well past the hour mark when English referee Steve Bennett awarded Bhutan a freekick. Dorji stepped up and scored his second of the game. The momentum remained with Bhutan and veteran striker Dinesh Chhetri scored a third before Dorji took full advantage of a tiring Montserratian team to complete his hat-trick and seal a 4–0 victory, Bhutan's first victory on the international stage against any opposition, indeed their first-ever result of any kind and the first time they had ever kept a clean sheet.

=== Slow regression (2003–present) ===
However, despite this memorable victory, Bhutan was unable to carry this form forward into competitive matches. Although the Bhutan Football Federation now received substantial payments as a member of FIFA, there was still very little money in the game for players, even those who played for the national team. Players who were unemployed outside football had to exist on a stipend from the Federation of only Nu 3–5,500 per month and there were no internationally certified coaches in the country at all, only amateurs and school teachers. It is no surprise then that Bhutan was defeated in all three games in the 2003 South Asian Football Federation Gold Cup, losing 6–0 to the Maldives, 2–0 to Nepal and 3–0 to hosts Bangladesh, returning home bottom of their group without scoring a single goal. They took advantage though in their next set of matches as they hosted Group F of the preliminary qualifying round for the 2004 AFC Asian Cup. Drawn with Guam and Mongolia, two teams ranked much closer to them than the majority of their previous opposition, they began their campaign with a 6–0 victory over Guam (a result that as of 2016 is still their record victory) and followed it up with a 0–0 draw against Mongolia to top their group and progress to the qualifying round proper. The victory over Guam was their biggest ever margin of victory to date and the two games undefeated in this group represents Bhutan's best run of form to date as of 2014. In the next stage though they were drawn against much stronger opposition in the shape of Saudi Arabia, Indonesia and Yemen. Faced with this increase in quality, Bhutan were outclassed in all six of their qualifying games, losing all of them and again failing to score a single goal in the process.

Their losing run continued into the 2005 South Asian Football Federation Gold Cup, where yet again they were to return home winless, losing 3–0 to Bangladesh and India respectively and 3–1 to Nepal, Bikash Pradhan scoring their only goal of the tournament, a consolation goal with Nepal already 3–0 up in what was a dead rubber for both sides.

From 2006 to 2009 saw something of an improvement in results for Bhutan. Entering the inaugural AFC Challenge Cup, they suffered narrow defeats to Nepal, 2–0 and Sri Lanka 1–0, before holding Brunei to a 0–0 draw. Although they failed to score and did not progress to the main competition, the draw against Brunei was their first positive result of any kind for nearly three years following a similar 0–0 draw with Mongolia and ended an eleven match losing streak. They did not play any international matches for the next two years, appearing again on the continental stage in the 2008 AFC Challenge Cup. Their performance was similar to the previous Challenge Cup, opening with a 3–1 loss to Tajikistan, Passang Tshering scoring for Bhutan after sixty-nine minutes, only for the Tajiks to seal the victory from the penalty spot in the dying minutes through Numonjon Hakimov. Bhutan achieved a better result in the next game, drawing 1–1 with Brunei. Nawang Dendhup gave Bhutan the initial advantage, a lead which they held until the seventy-sixth minute when Khayrun Bin Salleh equalized. Although a 3–0 loss to the Philippines in their final group game confirmed that again Bhutan would not be progressing to the competition proper. However, the two goals they scored and the draw achieved, meant that they finished in third place in the group above Brunei.

Bhutan built on the positive results they had gained from the previous two tournaments when they took part in the 2008 SAFF Championship. A late Nima Sangay goal was sufficient to give them a share of the points in their opening game against Bangladesh. They could not repeat the performance against the hosts Sri Lanka in their next game, losing 2–0, but recovered in their final game to record a 3–1 victory over Afghanistan, Yeshey Gyeltshen scoring twice and his namesake Yeshey Dorji getting the third before H.A. Habib scored a consolation for the Afghans. Sri Lanka beat Bangladesh in the other final group game to ensure that Bhutan finished as runners-up in the group and qualified for the knock-out rounds of a tournament for the first time in their history. They met India in the semi-finals and took the lead through Kinley Dorji after eighteen minutes. It was a lead they would hold for less than fifteen minutes though as Sunil Chhetri equalized before halftime. With no further goals in the second half, the game went to extra time only for Bhutan to see the possibility of victory snatched from them at the very last moment as Gouramangi Singh scored in added time at the end of extra time to claim the narrowest of victories for India. Nonetheless, the semi-final appearance is Bhutan's best performance in any tournament as of 2016.

Unfortunately, they were again not able to build on these positive performances. Their loss to India was the start of the longest losing streak in their history, which was ultimately to last for nineteen games. The 2010 AFC Challenge Cup qualifying competition began with a narrow 1–0 loss to the Philippines, but quickly worsened as Bhutan lost 7–0 to Turkmenistan and 5–0 to the Maldives to return home yet again without a point or scoring.

A Passang Tshering goal was of little consolation as a 2–1 friendly loss to Nepal failed to end the streak, before a similarly poor 2009 SAFF Championship saw them lose 4–1 to Bangladesh, 6–0 to Sri Lanka and 7–0 to Pakistan, a Nawang Dendhup penalty against Bangladesh being their only reward in all three games.

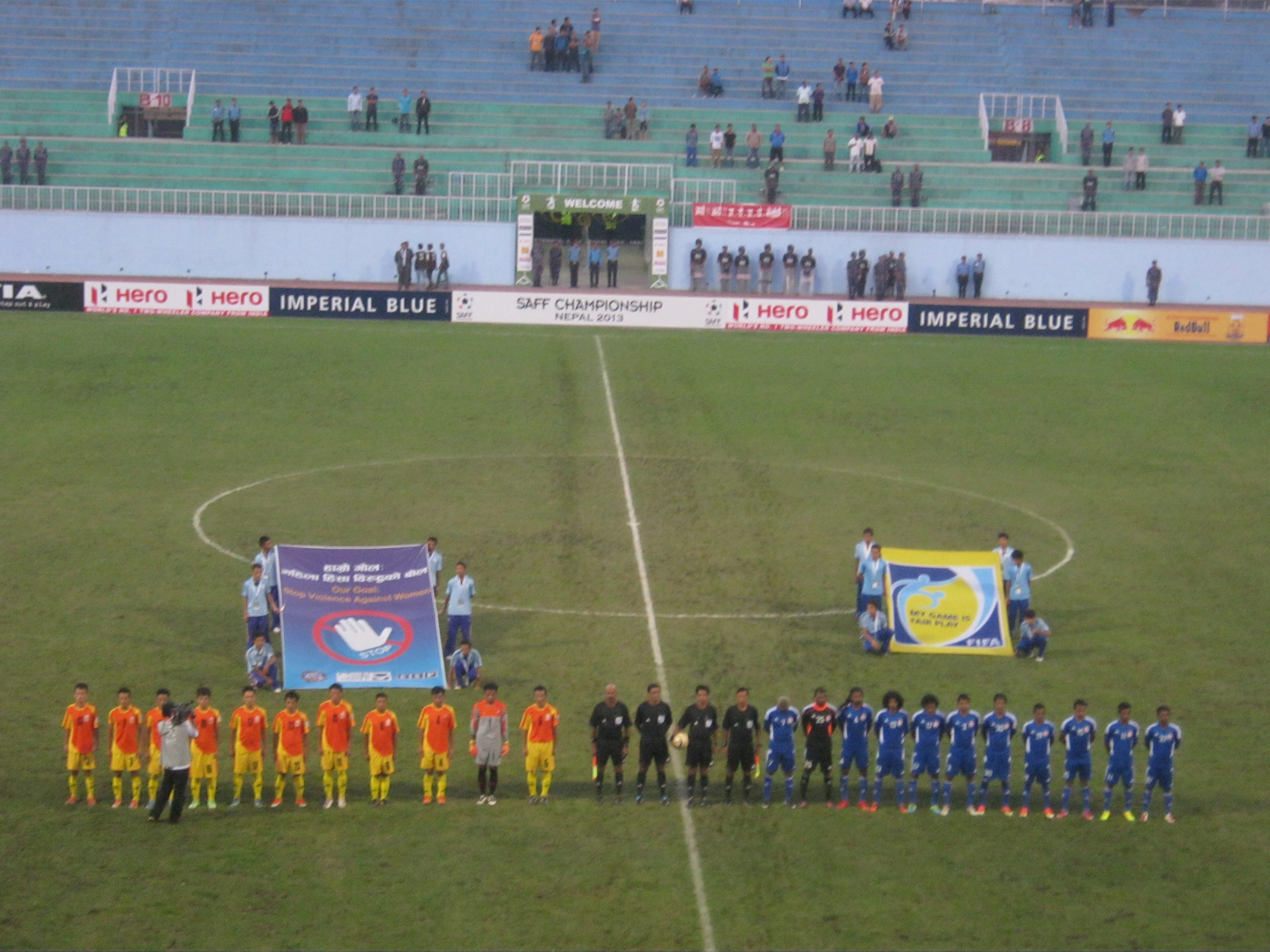
Bhutan lining up for the game against the Maldives at the 2013 SAFF Championship

Bhutan withdrew from the international stage for the next two years, re-emerging to play two back to back friendly matches against Nepal in preparation for the 2012 AFC Challenge Cup. Both of these games resulted in narrow losses, 1–0 and 2–1. Their 2012 AFC Challenge Cup qualification was essentially over before it started. Rather than being drawn in a group for initial qualification, the process was changed so that the lowest-ranked eight teams entering the competition played-off over two legs on a home-and-away basis. Bhutan perhaps suffered from the fact that neither leg was played in Bhutan, with both matches taking place at the Tau Devi Lal Stadium, Gurgaon, India, but nonetheless, a hat-trick from Sidiq Walizada in the first leg to give Afghanistan a 3–0 lead, made the second leg, which Afghanistan won 2–0, essentially irrelevant. A disappointing year was compounded with three successive defeats in the 2011 SAFF Championship, Bhutan losing 3–0 to Sri Lanka, 5–0 to India and finally 8–1 to Afghanistan, Chencho Gyeltshen's consolation being the only positive from the year's competition.

The team played only one match in 2012, a 5–0 lost friendly to Thailand, prior to the 2013 SAFF Championship. This tournament produced an almost identical result to the previous SAFF championship; Bhutan opened the competition losing 3–0 to Afghanistan, then 8–2 to the Maldives despite being 2–1 up at one point and level going into halftime, before rounding off another miserable year with a 5–2 loss to Sri Lanka. One of the main reasons suggested for Bhutan's significant drop in form was the amount of money available to players, even those who played for the national team. Yeshey Dorji, one of the country's leading players, announced his retirement following the 2013 SAFF Championships, citing an inability to generate a sufficient living from football as the main reason. In 2014, the Bhutan Football Federation withdrew the Nu 4,000 monthly payment to players in the national team, and whilst money is spent at grassroots, more needs to be spent on the national team as former national head coach Kazunori Ohara noted, once players get to the end of school age they often drop out of football completely.

==== 2018 FIFA World Cup qualification ====
In 2015, Bhutan made their first ever attempt to qualify for the FIFA World Cup entering the qualifiers for the 2018 edition. In preparation for their qualifying campaign, and in an attempt to improve the overall standard of football in the country and attract more players, the Bhutan Football Federation offered a monthly salary of Ng 10,000 to all players in the main national squad who are not currently on federation scholarships.

In their first ever qualifying match, they faced Sri Lanka in the two-legged preliminary round. In the first leg in Colombo, Bhutan produced a shock result, beating their hosts 1–0, with Tshering Dorji scoring the winner in the eighty-fourth minute. This result even drew praise from now-disgraced FIFA president Sepp Blatter who described the result as "a wonderful, historic moment" on Twitter, though Sri Lanka coach Nikola Kavazovic, whilst conceding Bhutan were the better team remained confident that his team would ultimately be victorious. The result was met very positively in Bhutan, with the team featuring heavily in the news. Anticipation ahead of the second leg at Changlimithang ran high, a half-day holiday was declared by the government for students and public sector employees and the gates to the ground were opened four hours prior to kick off. The game started positively for Bhutan as Chencho Gyeltshen, the country's only professional footballer, scored in the sixth minute. However, Sri Lanka equalised before half time through Subash Madushan. A disallowed goal for each side increased the tension as the game progressed but in injury time at the end of the second half Gyeltshen scored his second goal of the match to seal a 3–1 aggregate victory, ensuring they advanced to round 2 in the AFC qualifying section whilst Sri Lanka were eliminated. In qualifying for the second phase of the competition, Bhutan were guaranteed at least a place in the play-off round for the 2019 AFC Asian Cup.

For the next stage, Bhutan were drawn in Group C, along with China, Qatar, Hong Kong, and the Maldives, all sides ranked higher than Sri Lanka in the FIFA rankings. Against these much stronger teams, their results were not as successful. In their first game, they lost 7–0 against Hong Kong in the Mong Kok Stadium, and then 6–0 less than a week later against China at Changlimithang, the first time despite their lowly ranking that Bhutan had been beaten at home in an official international match. Results got worse still in the following match as they lost 15–0 to Qatar, their heaviest defeat since their then world record 20–0 loss to Kuwait in 2000. The next two matches saw an improvement in their fortunes. Though both were lost, the scorelines were much more narrow. Firstly a 4–3 home defeat to the Maldives, in which Bhutan showed a spirited display to come back from 4–0 down in the final five minutes. At half time in the match, following a disagreement with team manager Hishey Tshering, coach Norio Tsukitate was sacked, his rigid methodology having created significant friction between himself and the overall team management. Secondly a 1–0 home loss to Hong Kong, the winning goal coming in the penultimate minute of the match for the visitors. This was a result that pleased the Bhutan Football Federation so much that they awarded all of the players involved in the match a Nu 25,000 bonus to reflect their "brilliant performance". However the improvement in their performances was not to last and a visit to China resulted in a 12–0 loss, and a home match against Qatar another loss, this time 3–0.

Following their World Cup qualifying attempt, Bhutan entered the eleventh SAFF Championship, held in India between 23 December 2015 and 3 January 2016. Originally scheduled to take place in July 2015, the monsoon season and schedule congestion led to the tournament being postponed to late December. Their performance was identical to their efforts in the last four tournaments as the team lost all three group games beginning with a 3–1 defeat to the Maldives, Tshering Dorji scoring for Bhutan after 20 minutes, and followed by two 3–0 losses to Afghanistan and Bangladesh to be eliminated from the competition.

Prior to their last qualifying match, the national team visited Thailand where they played two back to back charity friendly matches against reigning Thai League T1 champions Buriram United. Although they were playing against a club side rather than a fellow national team, Bhutan were soundly beaten in both matches; firstly 6–0 and then 9–0 in a rematch the following day, with Buriram's new signing Weslley scoring five times across the two matches.

A final 4–2 defeat against the Maldives in Malé confirmed Bhutan's last place finish in their group with a −47 goal difference and extending their losing run in official competition to twelve games.

==== 2019 AFC Asian Cup qualification ====
Bar the initial victories over Sri Lanka, one of the few positives to be taken from their inaugural World Cup qualifying campaign was that their presence in the second round guaranteed their qualification for the qualifying playoff round of the 2019 AFC Asian Cup. Two rounds of play-off matches were played to determine the final eight qualifiers for the third round. The draw was made on 7 April 2016, at the AFC House in Kuala Lumpur, Malaysia. The first round of matches were played between 2 and 7 June 2016 and the second round of matches between 6 September and 11 October 2016. As the lowest ranked of all the teams taking part in the play-off round, Bhutan entered in round two, where they were drawn against Bangladesh. The first match was played on 6 September, with the second leg played on 11 October 2016. Bhutan drew the first leg 0–0, breaking a twelve match losing streak in official matches and a fifteen match losing streak in total. Bhutan ended up winning the second match 3–1, giving them a 3–1 advantage on aggregate and enabling them to advance to round three of the Asian Cup qualification. Bhutan were drawn on 23 January 2017 with Maldives, Palestine and Oman; the draw was moved from 18 January. The Bhutanese were eliminated from contention after four straight losses, especially a 10–0 away loss to Palestine.

==== 2022 FIFA World Cup qualification ====
Bhutan were eliminated when they lost 5–1 on aggregate to Guam. They won the first match at home 1–0 but lost the return leg 5–0.

== Team image ==
=== Colours ===
The flag of Bhutan, which is closely echoed in the national team's colours

Bhutan's current home colours are orange shirts with yellow trim and a yellow dragon motif, orange shorts and orange socks. Their away colours is predominantly white with orange trim on the shirt and shorts and an orange dragon motif. Both their home and away colours are so closely aligned to the national colours and pattern of the Flag of Bhutan that they essentially mirror it. The current kit manufacturer of the national teams is Hummel.

There are three main themes contained within Bhutan's home colours, all of which have wider symbolism within the nation as outlined in the Constitution of Bhutan. Firstly, the use of orange signifies Mahayana Buddhist spiritual tradition, particularly the Drukpa Kagyu and Nyingma schools. Secondly, the use of yellow in the trim and also as the colour of the dragon motif signifies civil tradition and temporal authority as embodied in the Druk Gyalpo, the Dragon King of Bhutan, whose royal garb traditionally includes a yellow kabney (scarf). Finally, the dragon motif employed is the Druk (Dzongkha: འབྲུག་) the "Thunder Dragon" of Bhutanese mythology and a Bhutanese national symbol, though the dragon depicted in the team's colours does not hold the jewels representing wealth that are found on the national flag, though the similar snarling mouth of the dragon symbolizes the Bhutanese deities' commitment to the defense of Bhutan.

The orange theme and that of the dragon motif noted above are carried over into the away colours. Additionally, the predominant white theme mirrors the colour of the dragon on the national flag which signifies the purity of inner thoughts and deeds that unite all the ethnically and linguistically diverse peoples of Bhutan.

==== Kit history ====
Home

2014	2015–2022	2023-2025	2026

Away

2014	2015–2022	2023-2025	2026

=== Goalkeeper kit ===
Home 2023	Away 2023

=== Logo ===
The logo of the national team is identical to that used for its governing body, the Bhutan Football Federation. It consists of a football surrounded by two concentric circles, one yellow, one orange, representing the Dragon King of Bhutan and the Buddhist tradition in the country, overlaid on a Himalayan blue poppy (Meconopsis horridula), the national flower of Bhutan. Below this is a wish-fulfilling jewel, similar to that located at the top of the official Emblem of Bhutan.

== Home stadium ==
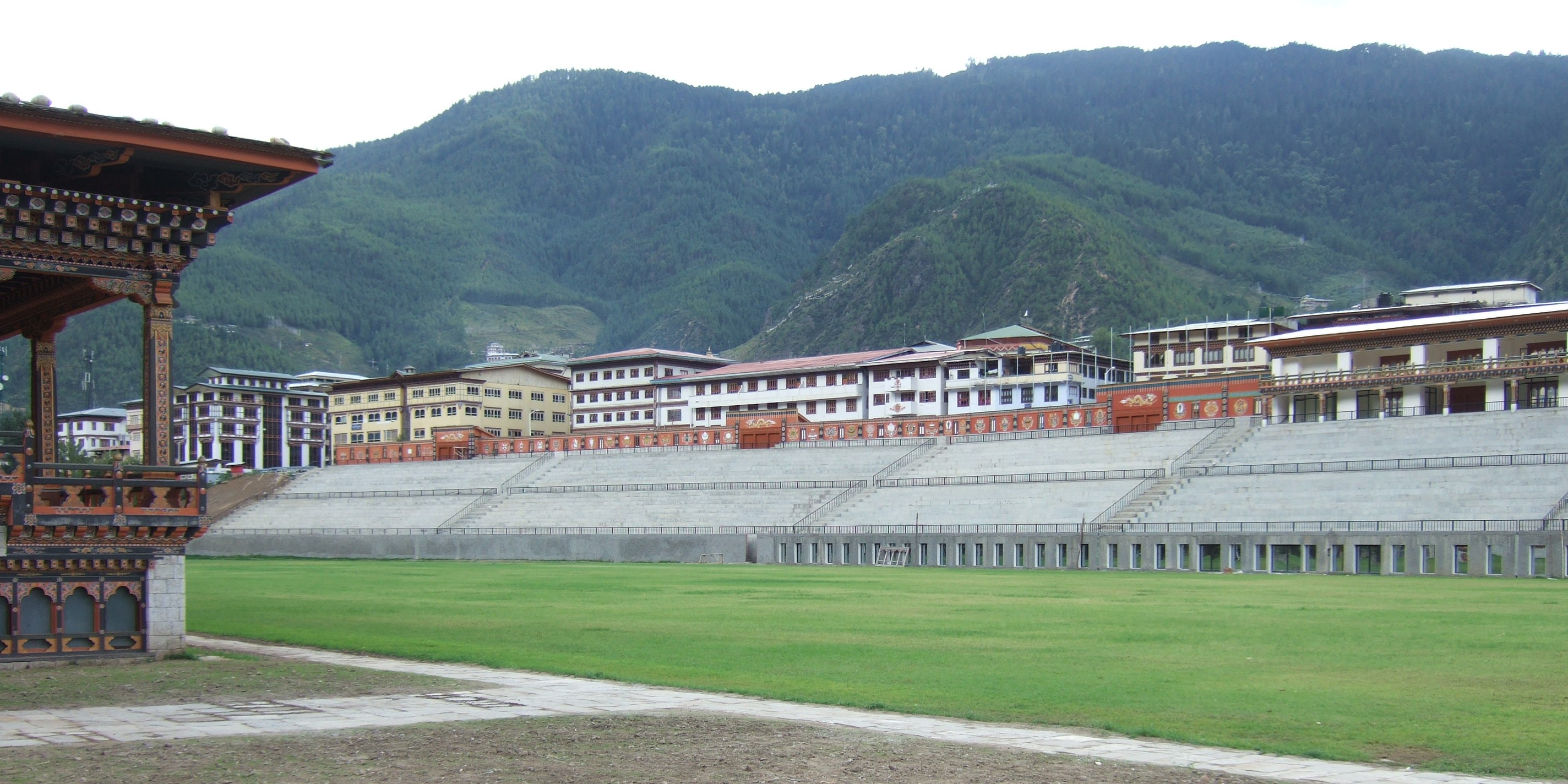
View of the main stand at Changlimithang Stadium

Changlimithang Stadium is a multi-purpose stadium in Thimphu, Bhutan, which serves as the national stadium. The stadium can holds a capacity of 15,000. It is predominantly used for football matches and is the home of both the Bhutan national football team and a number of Thimphu-based football clubs who play in both the Bhutan Premier League. In addition to football, the stadium also regularly plays host to major archery tournaments, the national sport of Bhutan. The stadium was initially constructed in 1974 for the coronation of the fourth Druk Gyalpo, Jigme Singye Wangchuck, but was completely refurbished in 2007 in advance of the coronation of the fifth Druk Gyalpo, Jigme Khesar Namgyel Wangchuck. Floodlights were added to the football pitch in 2009, and an artificial pitch was laid in 2012 to coincide with the start of the first season of the National League. Unusually for a national stadium, and as a result of the conversion of the playing surface to artificial turf, the football field at Changlimithang is available for public hire and is extremely popular with people in Thimphu.

== Results and fixtures ==
The following is a list of match results in the last 12 months, as well as any future matches that have been scheduled.

Win Draw Loss Fixture

=== 2026 ===
31 March 2027 AFC Asian Cup qualification	Bhutan	2–1	Brunei	Guwahati, India
18:00 UTC+5:30	Gyeltshen 39', 45+1'	Report; Report (AFC)	Yazid 29'	Stadium: Indira Gandhi Athletic Stadium; Attendance: 549; Referee: Venkatesh Ramachandran (India)

4 June Friendly	Cambodia	4–0	Bhutan	Phnom Penh, Cambodia
19:00 UTC+7	Rotana 7'; Coulibaly 38'; Sophal 68'; Rado 85'			Stadium: Olympic Stadium; Referee: Wun Tam Ping (Hong Kong)

8 June Friendly	Bhutan	1–4	Sri Lanka	Bangkok, Thailand
	Rinzin 80'		Dekker 16'; Bharath 63'; Razeek 78'; Rahul 92'	Stadium: NT Stadium; Referee: Wiwat Jumpaoon (Thailand)

5 November 2026 2026 SAFF Championship	Bhutan	0–1	Bangladesh	Dhaka, Bangladesh
20:00 UTC+6		SAFF; FIFA	Ibrahim 69'	Stadium: National Stadium; Attendance: 12,783; Referee: Thoriq Alkatiri (Indonesia)

8 November 2026 2026 SAFF Championship	Sri Lanka	2–2	Bhutan	Dhaka, Bangladesh
20:00 UTC+6	Kelaart 35'; Razeek 43'	SAFF; FIFA	Tshering 34'; Gyeltshen 76'	Stadium: National Stadium; Attendance: 1,012; Referee: Mohammed Khalfan Al Manai (Oman)

14 November 2026 2026 SAFF Championship	India	2–1	Bhutan	Dhaka, Bangladesh
15:00 UTC+6	Vishnu 8'; Konsham 27'	SAFF [ FIFA]	Tobden 48'	Stadium: National Stadium; Attendance: 1,700; Referee: Thoriq Alkatiri (Indonesia)

== Technical staff ==
As of August 2026

Staff
Head coach	(Australia) Gary Phillips
Assistant	(Bhutan) Chencho Dorji
Goalkeeping coach	(Bhutan) Jigme Chogyal Tshering
Fitness coach	(Bhutan) Phuntsho Tobgay
Video analyst	(Bhutan) Namgyal Tenzin Dorji
Team manager	(Bhutan) Ugyen Kinzang Wangchuck

== Coaching history ==
As of November 2026

Coach	Dates	P	W	D	L	Win %
(South Korea) Kang Byung-chan	2000–02	5	0	0	5	0.0
(South Korea) Yoo Kee-heung	2002	0	0	0	0	—
(Netherlands) Arie Schans	2002–03	2	1	0	1	50.0
(Netherlands) Henk Walk	2003	4	0	0	4	0.0
(Bhutan) Khare Basnet	2003–08	23	3	5	15	13.0
(Japan) Koji Gyotoku	2008–10	14	1	2	11	7.1
(Japan) Hiroaki Matsuyama	2010–12	7	0	0	7	0.0
(Japan) Kazunori Ohara	2012–14	4	0	0	4	0.0
(Bhutan) Chokey Nima	2015	2	2	0	0	100.0
(Japan) Norio Tsukitate	2015	4	0	0	4	0.0
(Bhutan) Pema Dorji	2015–16	8	0	1	7	0.0
(Germany) Torsten Spittler	2016–17	5	1	0	4	20.0
(Bhutan) Chencho Dorji	2017–18	1	0	0	1	0.0
(England) Trevor Morgan	2018	5	0	0	5	0.0
(Bhutan) Pema Dorji	2019–23	12	3	1	8	25.0
(South Korea) Kim Tae-in	2024	2	0	0	2	0.0
(Japan) Atsushi Nakamura	2024–26	9	1	1	7	11.1
(Bhutan) Chencho Dorji	2026	3	1	0	2	33.3
(Australia) Gary Phillips	2026–	2	0	1	1	0.0

^{1} Coached in an interim capacity.

== Players ==
The following players were named in the squad for the 2027 AFC Asian Cup qualification – third round match against Yemen on 25 March 2025.

Caps and goals updated as of 8 September 2024

No.	Pos.	Player	Date of birth (age)	Caps	Goals	Club
1	GK	Dendup Namgyel	15 August 2002 (age 24)	1	0	(Bhutan Football Federation) Royal College
21	GK	Tobgay	29 September 1998 (age 28)	0	0	(Bhutan Football Federation) Tensung
22	GK	Tenzin Dorji	28 November 2000 (age 25)	0	0	(Bhutan Football Federation) Paro
2	DF	Yeshi Gyeltshen	30 October 2001 (age 25)	2	0	(Bhutan Football Federation) Royal College
3	DF	Sherub Dorji	17 April 2002 (age 24)	11	0	(Bhutan Football Federation) Royal College
4	DF	Tenzin Norbu	8 May 2001 (age 25)	8	1	(Football Australia) Balga SC
6	DF	Jignam Seltob Dorji	13 January 2006 (age 20)	0	0	(Bhutan Football Federation) BFF Academy
9	DF	Tenzin Dorji	18 August 1997 (age 29)	21	0	(Bhutan Football Federation) Druk Lhayul
14	DF	Kezang Dorji	23 April 2002 (age 24)	2	0	(Bhutan Football Federation) Paro
13	DF	Jigdrel Wangchuk	12 September 2002 (age 24)	3	0	(Bhutan Football Federation) Transport United
18	DF	Kinzang Tashi Tobden	3 February 2005 (age 21)	0	0	(Bhutan Football Federation) Thimphu City
19	DF	Nima Gyeltshen	4 December 2002 (age 23)	0	0	(Bhutan Football Federation) Royal College
5	MF	Karma Chetrim	20 February 2003 (age 23)	3	0	(Bhutan Football Federation) Ugyen Academy
7	MF	Rinzin Dorji	4 June 2007 (age 19)	0	0	(Bhutan Football Federation) BFF Academy
8	MF	Phurba Tenzin	6 August 1999 (age 27)	2	0	(Bhutan Football Federation) Thimphu City
10	MF	Orgyen Tshering	14 September 1999 (age 27)	9	0	(Bangladesh Football Federation) Bangladesh Police
12	MF	Pema Zangpo	24 March 2005 (age 21)	2	0	(Myanmar Football Federation) Yarmaya United
15	MF	Nima Wangdi (Captain)	6 December 1998 (age 27)	26	0	(Bhutan Football Federation) Thimphu City
16	MF	Tshelthrim Namgyel	1 July 2002 (age 24)	11	1	(Bhutan Football Federation) Paro
11	FW	Kinga Wangchuk	19 September 2002 (age 24)	10	1	(Bhutan Football Federation) Paro
17	FW	Kelzang Jigme	17 January 2004 (age 22)	2	0	(Bhutan Football Federation) Royal College
20	FW	Kinzang Tenzin	19 September 2002 (age 24)	1	0	(Bhutan Football Federation) Royal College
23	FW	Bikash Pradhan	21 January 2004 (age 22)	4	0	(Bhutan Football Federation) Transport United

=== Recent call-ups ===
The following players have also been called up to the Bangladesh squad within the last twelve months.

Pos.	Player	Date of birth (age)	Caps	Goals	Club	Latest call-up
^{INJ} Withdrew due to injury^{PRE} Preliminary squad / standby^{RET} Retired from the national team^{SUS} Serving suspension^{WD} Player withdrew from the squad due to non-injury issue.

== Player records ==
As of 14 October 2025
Players in bold are still active with Bhutan.

=== Most appearances ===
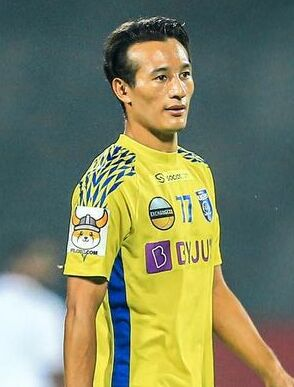
Chencho Gyeltshen is Bhutan's top goalscorer and their most capped player.

Rank	Player	Caps	Goals	Career
1	**Chencho Gyeltshen**	46	13	2011–present
2	**Karma Shedrup Tshering**	39	1	2011–present
3	Passang Tshering	36	5	2003–2015
4	Pema Dorji	31	0	2003–2013
4	Tshering Dorji	31	5	2011–2019
4	Hari Gurung	31	0	2009–2024
4	**Nima Wangdi**	31	0	2016–present
8	Jigme Tshering Dorji	29	1	2011–2019
9	Nawang Dhendup	27	2	2003–2011
9	Kinley Dorji	27	1	2002–2011

=== Top goalscorers ===
Rank	Player	Goals	Caps	Ratio	Career
1	**Chencho Gyeltshen**	13	46	0.28	2011–present
2	Wangay Dorji	5	14	0.36	2002–2008
2	Tshering Dorji	5	31	0.16	2011–2019
2	Passang Tshering	5	36	0.14	2003–2015
5	Dinesh Chhetri	4	14	0.29	2002–2003
6	Nawang Dhendup	2	27	0.07	2003–2011

== Competitive record ==
=== FIFA World Cup ===
FIFA World Cup							Qualification					
Year	Pld	W	D*	L	F	A	Pld	W	D*	L	F	A
(Uruguay) 1930 to (France) 1998	Not a FIFA member						Not a FIFA member					
(South Korea) (Japan) 2002 to (Brazil) 2014	Did not enter						Did not enter					
(Russia) 2018	Did not qualify						10	2	0	8	8	53
(Qatar) 2022	Did not qualify						2	1	0	1	1	5
(Canada) (Mexico) (United States) 2026	Did not qualify						2	1	0	1	2	4
(Morocco) (Portugal) (Spain) 2030	To be determined						To be determined					
(Saudi Arabia) 2034	To be determined						To be determined					
Total	0	0/3	0	0	0	0	14	4	0	10	11	62

=== AFC Asian Cup ===
AFC Asian Cup							AFC Asian Cup qualification					
Year	Pld	W	D*	L	GF	GA	Pld	W	D*	L	GF	GA
(Hong Kong) 1956 to (United Arab Emirates) 1996	Did not enter						Did not enter					
(Lebanon) 2000	Did not qualify						4	0	0	4	2	42
(China) 2004	Did not qualify						8	1	1	6	6	26
(Indonesia) (Malaysia) (Thailand) (Vietnam) 2007 to (Australia) 2015	Did not enter						Did not enter					
(United Arab Emirates) 2019*	Did not qualify						18	3	1	14	13	93
(Qatar) 2023	Did not qualify						2	1	0	1	1	5
(Saudi Arabia) 2027	Did not qualify						6	1	1	4	3	12
Total	0	0	0	0	0	0	38	6	3	29	25	178

*: 2019 qualification campaign also included qualifying matches from the Asian section of the 2018 FIFA World Cup qualification. In 2014, a proposal to merge the preliminary qualification rounds of the FIFA World Cup with those of the AFC Asian Cup was ratified by the AFC Competitions Committee. The new qualification structure took place in three stages, with the first two merging with the 2018 FIFA World Cup qualification.

=== AFC Challenge Cup ===
AFC Challenge Cup								AFC Challenge Cup qualification record					
Year	Result	Pld	W	D*	L	GF	GA	Pld	W	D*	L	GF	GA
(Bangladesh) 2006	Group stage	3	0	1	2	0	3	No qualification stage					
(India) 2008	Did not qualify							3	0	1	2	1	6
(Sri Lanka) 2010	Did not qualify							3	0	0	3	0	13
(Nepal) 2012	Did not qualify							2	0	0	2	0	5
(Maldives) 2014	Did not enter							Did not enter					
Total	Group stage	3	0	1	2	0	3	8	0	1	7	1	24

=== SAFF Championship ===
SAFF Championship
Year	Result	Pld	W	D*	L	GF	GA
(Pakistan) 1993	Did not enter						
(Sri Lanka) 1995	Did not enter						
(Nepal) 1997	Did not enter						
(India) 1999	Did not enter						
(Bangladesh) 2003	Group stage	3	0	0	3	0	11
(Pakistan) 2005	Group stage	3	0	0	3	1	9
(Maldives) (Sri Lanka) 2008	**Semi-finals**	**4**	**1**	**1**	**2**	**5**	**6**
(Bangladesh) 2009	Group stage	3	0	0	3	0	17
(India) 2011	Group stage	3	0	0	3	0	16
(Nepal) 2013	Group stage	3	0	0	3	4	16
(India) 2015	Group stage	3	0	0	3	1	9
(Bangladesh) 2018	Group stage	3	0	0	3	0	9
(Maldives) 2021	Did not participate						
(India) 2023	Group stage	3	0	0	3	2	9
(Bangladesh) 2026	**Semi-finals**						
Total	Semi-finals	28	1	1	26	13	102

*Denotes draws includes knockout matches decided on penalty kicks. Red border indicates that the tournament was hosted on home soil. Gold, silver, bronze backgrounds indicates 1st, 2nd and 3rd finishes respectively. Bold text indicates best finish in tournament.

== Head-to-head record ==
Last match updated: Sri Lanka on 8 November 2026.

More wins Wins equal losses More losses

Opponent	Played	Won	Drawn	Lost	For	Against	Diff	Win %	Loss %
Afghanistan	6	1	0	5	4	20	−16	16.67%	83.33%
Bangladesh	20	2	2	16	9	44	−35	10%	80%
Brunei	4	1	2	1	4	4	0	50%	50%
Cambodia	2	0	0	2	0	6	−6	0%	100%
Central African Republic	1	0	0	1	0	6	−6	0%	100%
China	2	0	0	2	0	18	−18	0%	100%
Guam	3	2	0	1	7	5	+2	66%	33%
Hong Kong	4	1	0	3	2	12	−10	25%	75%
India	6	0	0	6	1	19	−18	0%	100%
Indonesia	2	0	0	2	0	4	−4	0%	100%
Kuwait	1	0	0	1	0	20	−20	0%	100%
Laos	1	0	0	1	1	2	−1	0%	100%
Lebanon	3	0	0	3	1	10	−9	0%	100%
Macau	1	1	0	0	1	0	+1	100%	0%
Malaysia	1	0	0	1	0	7	−7	0%	100%
Maldives	10	0	0	10	8	42	−34	0%	100%
Mongolia	1	0	1	0	0	0	0	0%	0%
Montserrat	1	1	0	0	4	0	+4	100%	0%
Nepal	15	0	1	14	7	46	−39	0%	93,33%
Oman	2	0	0	2	2	18	−16	0%	100%
Pakistan	3	0	0	3	1	12	−11	0%	100%
Palestine	2	0	0	2	0	12	−12	0%	100%
Philippines	2	0	0	2	0	4	−4	0%	100%
Qatar	2	0	0	2	0	18	−18	0%	100%
Saudi Arabia	2	0	0	2	0	10	−10	0%	100%
Sri Lanka	10	2	1	7	8	26	−18	20.00%	70.00%
Tajikistan	1	0	0	1	1	3	−2	0%	100%
Thailand	1	0	0	1	0	5	−5	0%	100%
Turkmenistan	2	0	0	2	0	15	−15	0%	100%
Yemen	5	0	1	4	3	30	−27	0%	80%
Official Total	116	11	8	97	64	418	−354	9.48%	83.62%

Unofficial matches

Opponent	Played	Won	Drawn	Lost	For	Against	Diff	Win %	Loss %
Bangladesh	2	0	0	2	0	6	−21	0%	100%
(Thailand) Buriram United	2	0	0	2	0	15	−15	0%	100%
(China) Guangzhou	1	0	0	1	1	6	−5	0%	100%
Hong Kong Gurkhas	1	0	1	0	?	?	?	0%	0%
India B	1	0	0	1	0	3	−3	0%	100%
(China) Kunming Army Team	1	0	0	1	1	3	−2	0%	100%
Nepal Red	1	0	0	1	0	1	−1	0%	100%
Nepal Youth	1	0	1	0	?	?	?	0%	0%
(South Korea) Soongsil University	1	0	0	1	0	6	−6	0%	100%
Tibet	2	1	1	0	5	4	+1	0%	0%
Unofficial Total*	13	1	3	9	7	44	−37	0%	70%

NB: Unofficial matches includes ANFA Cup matches against teams other than the official Nepal national team, four friendly matches against Tibet and Bangladesh and two charity matches against Buriram United.
*: Includes unofficial matches in the 1986 ANFA Cup against Hong Kong Gurkhas and Nepal Youth which sources indicate were drawn but for which no score is available. The results are included here statistically as 0–0 for the purpose of completeness.

== Rankings ==
=== FIFA ===
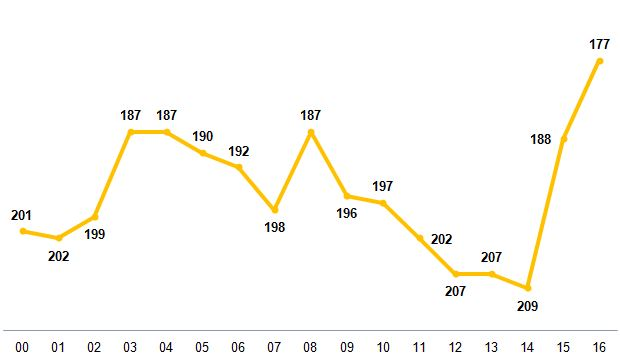
Bhutan average yearly FIFA rankings 2000–2016

Prior to the victories over Sri Lanka, their highest FIFA ranking achieved was 187th, which they last reached in December 2008 following their semi-final performance in the 2008 SAFF Championship. From that high point, they slipped down the rankings to last place in December 2012 to join San Marino and the Turks and Caicos Islands in 207th. They fell to 208th place following the admission to FIFA of South Sudan in July 2014, and dropped to 209th as the only team without ranking points following San Marino's draw with Estonia. However, Bhutan rose to 163rd on the FIFA rankings after two victories over Sri Lanka in World Cup qualifying, achieving their highest ranking ever in April 2015. They then rose to 156th in June 2015. However, following their performance in the second round of world cup qualifying in which they have failed to win a game, they slipped back to 193rd as of February, but have since risen to 185th as of November 2017.

=== Elo ratings ===
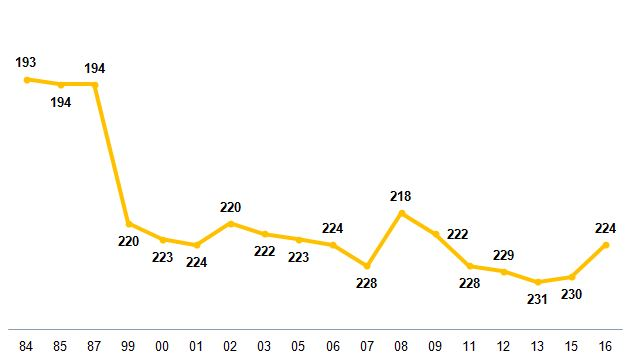
Bhutan year-end Elo ratings 1984–2016

The team is also ranked extremely low on the all time Elo ratings at 227th out of 234 as of December 2017. There is one FIFA affiliated team ranked below them, American Samoa. Their initial comparatively high position in the 1980s was more to do with the number of nations competing globally at the time than their specific performances. Since they have started competing with a degree of regularity on the continental scene, Bhutan have always hovered at or near the bottom of the ratings. Their high point in the 21st century was 218th as a result of their performance at the 2008 SAFF Championship.

== Honours ==
=== Friendly ===
- The Other Final (1): 2002

=== Awards ===
- SAFF Championship Fair Play Award (2): 2005, 2018

== See also ==
- Bhutan national under-23 football team
- Bhutan national under-20 football team
- Bhutan national under-17 football team
- Bhutan national futsal team
