= Gomtu FC =

Bhutanese football club

Gomtu
- Full name: Gomtu Football Club
- Ground: Changlimithang; Thimphu
- Capacity: 15,000
- League: Bhutan A-Division
- 2001: A-Division, 5th

Gomtu Football Club was a football club from Gomtu, Bhutan, which last played in the Bhutan A-Division, then the top level of football in Bhutan.

== History ==
They competed in the 2001 season although it is not clear whether this was by right or through qualification from that season's Thimphu League, Gomtu were drawn in Group B along with Samtse and Druk Star. They lost to both teams, 1–0 to eventual runners-up Samtse and 5–0 to eventual winners Druk Star, finishing in fifth place overall (as Paro had a worse goal difference) and did not progress to the semi-finals. It is not known whether they competed again, and there is no record of them competing in any future season for which records exist.
