= Arie Schans =

Dutch football manager (born 1952)

Personal information
- Full name: Arie Schans
- Date of birth: 12 December 1952 (age 73)
- Place of birth: Netherlands

Managerial career
- Years: Team
- 2002–2003: Bhutan
- 2005: Oita Trinita (caretaker)
- 2008: Namibia
- 2013: Guizhou Zhicheng
- 2015: Jiangsu Guoxin-Sainty (caretaker)

Arie Schans (born 12 December 1952) is a Dutch football manager. He initially started as a trainer within the Netherlands before he took over as Bhutan's coach and would star in the documentary film The Other Final about two of the lowest ranked teams in the FIFA World Rankings having to face each other. After beating the opposition Montserrat from the documentary (4–0), he spent some time attempting to improve Bhutanese football quality before returning to assistant coaching and having spells at Oita Trinita and Namibia, the latter of whom he guided to the 2008 African Cup of Nations.

== Career ==
He initially started out as a trainer in 1971, and from 1977 to 1985 he was associated with lower league Dutch side FC Wageningen. In 2001, he was the trainer for Dutch amateur football club GVVV where he became the first trainer within Dutch amateur football to be appointed as full-time.

Schans would take the Bhutan national football team job in 2002 and would star within the documentary film The Other Final, about the two lowest ranked teams in the FIFA World Rankings playing a game. After beating the opposition Montserrat from the documentary, Arie spent several months attempting to improve football standards in Bhutan before deciding to move to Japan and join top tier Japanese side Oita Trinita as an assistant. In 2005, he was brought in as a caretaker manager after Hwangbo Kwan left the club, however Péricles Chamusca soon stepped in on a permanent basis and Arie would soon return to the Netherlands.

After spending several seasons teaching coaches in Australia, Bulgaria, Mozambique and South Africa, Arie returned to football as trainer for top tier Chinese side Changchun Yatai F.C. and aided the young manager Gao Hongbo to win the Championship. The following year Arie took the Namibia national football team job after the sudden death of their previous manager Ben Bamfuchile. Arie was quickly asked to send a squad to the 2008 African Cup of Nations, however within the tournament Namibia were quickly knocked-out of the competition after suffering two defeats and a draw, which soon saw Arie leave the team. This time Arie would move back to China where he was brought in by Nanchang Hengyuan and Beijing Baxy F.C. as a Technical Director before he moved back into management with second tier Chinese club Guizhou Zhicheng on 28 May 2013.

== Managerial statistics ==
Team	From	To	Record				
Team	From	To	G	W	D	L	Win %
Oita Trinita	2005	2005	1	0	0	1	0.00
Total			1	0	0	1	0.00
