= Dorji Wangchuk =

- Born: c. 1967 (age 58–59); East Bhutan
- Education: University of Hamburg (Ph.D.)
- Occupations: Tibetologist; Buddhologist
- Employer: University of Hamburg

Dorji Wangchuk (born c. 1967) is a Bhutanese-German professor for Tibetan (Buddhist) Studies at the Department of Indian and Tibetan Studies in the University of Hamburg's Asien-Afrika-Institute and is a contemporary Tibetologist and a Buddhologist. He is also the founder and director of the Khyentse Center for Tibetan Buddhist Textual Scholarship (KC-TBTS), a research center within the Department of Indian and Tibetan Studies at the University of Hamburg's Asien-Afrika-Institute.

His main teaching and research interests lie in Tibetan Buddhist philosophy, Tibetan intellectual history and history of ideas, and Tibetan Buddhist intellectual, literary, and textual culture. Currently, he is working on the perception and reception of Yogācāra in Tibet and on the identity, superiority, and authenticity issues of the Vidhyādharapiṭaka in Tibetan Buddhism.

== Career ==
After completing a nine-year course in the study of Tibetan Buddhism from the monastic seminary of India's Ngagyur Nyingma Institute in Bylakuppe, Mysore, Dorji Wangchuk majored in both Classical Indology and Tibetology at the University of Hamburg, graduating with a Masters of Arts in 2002. He wrote his doctoral dissertation on "The Resolve to Become a Buddha: A Study of the Bodhicitta Concept in Indo-Tibetan Buddhism" and received his PhD from the same university in 2005.

Between 1992 and 1996, he taught Tibetan Buddhist monks and nuns in monastic seminaries in India. Since 1998, he has been teaching and researching at the University of Hamburg in various capacities. He also taught a term each at the University of Copenhagen, McGill University, and Renmin University of China.

On January 6, 2011, Wangchuk founded the Khyentse Center for Tibetan Buddhist Textual Scholarship. The research center focuses on the preservation and distribution of Buddhist texts. In May 2012, the research center launched a bilingual version of its website, available in English and German. In 2015, Wangchuk co-founded BuddhaNexus, a digital library developed for the purposes of matching text with Tibetan works, with professors Orna Almogi and Sebastian Nehrdich. In 2018, BuddhaNexus collaborated with the International Institute for Digital Humanities in Tokyo to create charts of various matches within Tibetan Buddhist texts.

== Works ==
=== Monographs ===
- Wangchuk, Dorji (2007). The Resolve to Become a Buddha: A Study of the Bodhicitta Concept in Indo-Tibetan Buddhism. Studia Philologica Buddhica Monograph Series. Vol. 23. Tokyo: International Institute for Buddhist Studies.

=== Chapters ===
==== In English ====
- Wangchuk, Dorji (2002). "An Eleventh-Century Defence of the Guhyagarbha Tantra". In Eimer, Helmut; Germano, David (eds.). The Many Canons of Tibetan Buddhism: Proceedings of the International Association for Tibetan Studies, PIATS 2000, Leiden. Leiden: Brill. pp. 265–291.
- Mathes, Klaus-Dieter; Sheehy, Michael, eds. (2019). "Where Buddhas and Siddhas Meet: Mi-pham's Yuganaddhavāda Philosophy". The Other Emptiness: Rethinking the Zhentong Buddhist Discourse in Tibet. Albany, New York: State University of New York Press. pp. 273–322.
- Wangchuk, Dorji (2014). "The Diachronic and Synchronic Relationship between Philosophical Theory and Spiritual Praxis in Buddhism: With Special Reference to the Case of the Four Applications of Mindfulness (smṛtyupasthāna: dran pa nye bar gzhag pa) in Vajrayāna". Buddhist Meditative Praxis: Traditional Teachings and Modern Application. Hong Kong: Centre of Buddhist Studies, The University of Hong Kong. p. 25.
- Wangchuk, Dorji (2015). "Biblioclasm/Libricide in the History of Tibetan Buddhism". The Illuminating Mirror: Tibetan Studies in Honour of per K. Sørensen on the Occasion of his 65th Birthday.
- Baba, Norihisa, ed. (2016). "On the Identity and Authenticity of the Sarvadharmacaryopadeśābhisamayatantra: A Tantric Scripture Associated with the Vikramashila Tradition". Relationship Between Tantric and Non-Tantric Doctrines in Late Indian Buddhism. Oriental Culture. 96. Tokyo: Institute for Advanced Studies on Asia, The University of Tokyo: 95–106.
- Kragh, Ulrich Timme, ed. (2013). "On the Status of the Yogācāra School in Tibetan Buddhism". The Foundation for Yoga Practitioners: The Buddhist Yogācārabhūmi Treatise and Its Adaption in India, East Asia, and Tibet. Harvard Oriental Series. Vol. 75. Cambridge, Massachusetts: Harvard University Press. pp. 1316–1328.
- "Was Mi-pham a Dialectical Monist? On a Recent Study of Mi-pham's Interpretation of the Buddha-Nature Theory". Indo-Iranian Journal. 55: 15–38. 2012.
- Franco, Eli; Eigner, Dagmar, eds. (2009). "A Relativity Theory of the Purity and Validity of Perception in Indo-Tibetan Buddhism" (PDF). Yogic Perception, Meditation, and Altered States of Consciousness. Vienna: Austrian Academy of Sciences. pp. 215–237.
- Almogi, Orna, ed. (2008). "Cross-Referential Clues for a Relative Chronology of Klong chen pa's Works". Contributions to Tibetan Buddhist Literature. PIATS 2006: Tibetan Studies: Proceedings of the Eleventh Seminar of the International Association for Tibetan Studies. Beiträge zur Zentralasienforschung. Halle: International Institute for Tibetan and Buddhist Studies. pp. 195–244.
- "The rÑiṅ-ma Interpretations of the Tathāgatagarbha Theory". Wiener Zeitschrift für die Kunde Südasiens. 48: 171–213. 2005.
- Eimer, Helmut; Germano, David, eds. (2002). "An Eleventh-Century Defence of the Guhyagarbhatantra". The Many Canons of Tibetan Buddhism. PIATS 2000. Tibetan Studies. Leiden, Boston, Cologne: Brill. pp. 265–291.

==== In German ====
- "Das dPal-yul–Kloster in Geschichte und Gegenwart: Die Wiederbelebung einer klösterlichen Tradition der rNying-ma–Schule" (PDF). Buddhismus in Geschichte und Gegenwart 11 (in German). Hamburg: Universität Hamburg. 2006. pp. 213–234.
- "Die vier buddhistische Traditionen Tibets: Teil 1: Die Nyingmapas" (PDF). Tibet und Buddhismus (in German) (20/78): 24–28. 2006.
- "Einige philosophische Grundlagen der rDzogs-chen Meditation" (PDF). Buddhismus in Geschichte und Gegenwart 8 (in German). Hamburg: Universität Hamburg. 2003. pp. 165–181.
- "Die große Vollendung wie sie in Rong-zom-pa's Werk dargestellt wird" (PDF). Buddhismus in Geschichte und Gegenwart 5 (in German). Hamburg: Universität Hamburg. 2001. pp. 41–53.
- "Madhyamaka aus der Sicht der rNying-ma Tradition" (PDF). Buddhismus in Geschichte und Gegenwart 4 (in German). Hamburg: Universität Hamburg. 2000. pp. 211–233.
