= Dorji Yangki =

Bhutanese architect

- Born: Dungkar, Kurtoe Gewog, Lhuntse District, Bhutan
- Education: Deakin University, University of York, Harvard Graduate School of Design
- Occupation: Architect

Dorji Yangki is a Bhutanese architect specializing in architectural conservation, sustainable design, and heritage management. She is among the first Bhutanese architects to receive international training.

== Early life and education ==
Yangki was raised in the village of Dungkar in Kurtoe Gewog, Lhuntse District, Bhutan. She has cited several childhood role models, including King Jigme Singye Wangchuck, Burmese politician Aung San Suu Kyi, and her grandfather, Lama Sonam Zangpo, a Buddhist monk. She completed her secondary education at Punakha High School and Kanglung College before receiving a scholarship to study architecture at Deakin University in Melbourne.

She later attended the University of York, where she earned a master's degree in conservation of historic buildings in 2004. In 2008, she was awarded the Harvard Graduate School of Design's Loeb Fellowship, which enabled her to spend a year studying Western approaches to architectural preservation and sustainable architecture.

== Architectural career ==
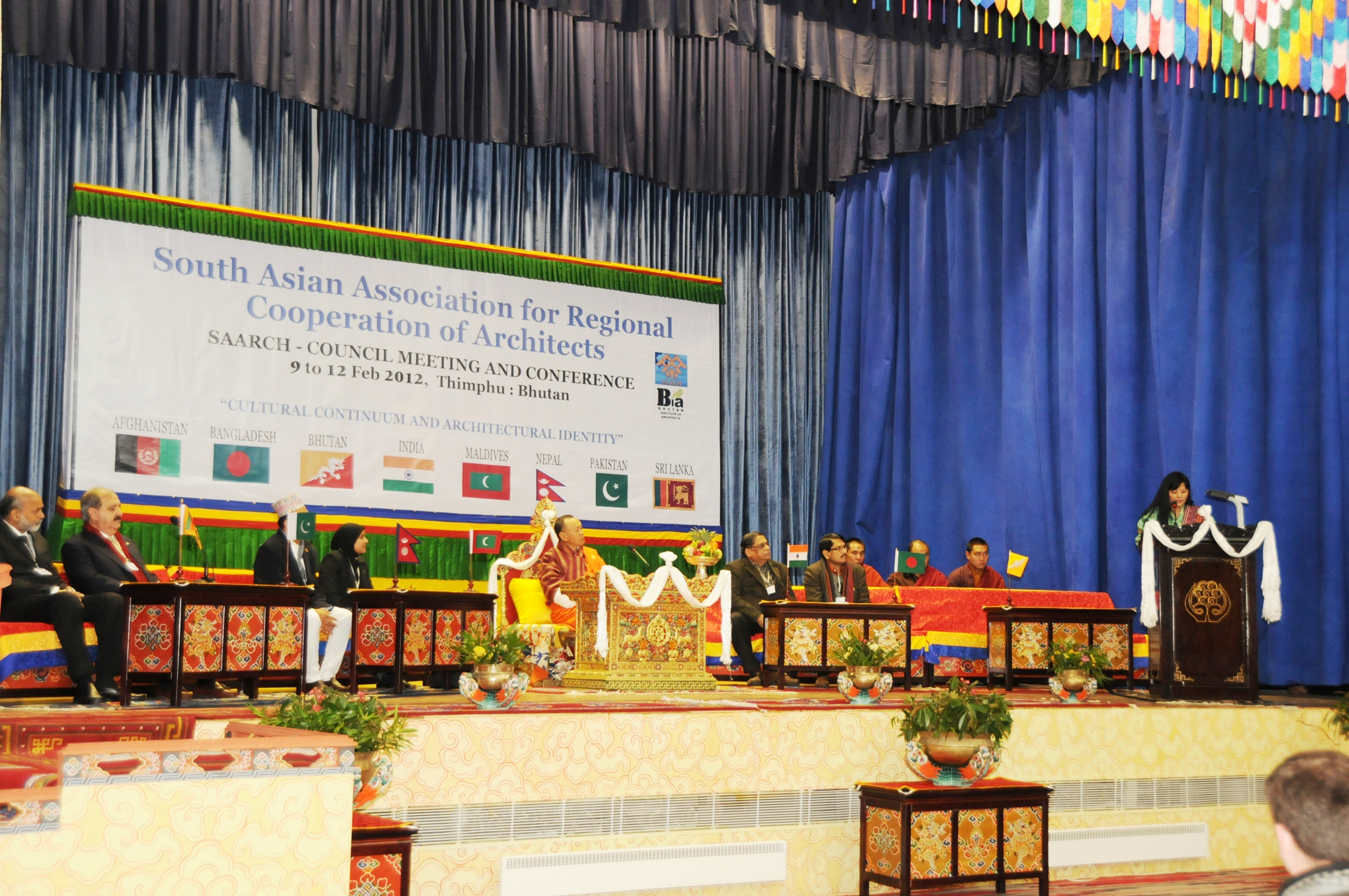
SAARCH meeting of architects of South Asia

Yangki began her career as an architect with Bhutan's Special Commission for Cultural Affairs in 1997. After the commission was incorporated into the Ministry of Home and Cultural Affairs in 2003, she became chief architect and head of its Division for the Conservation of Heritage Sites (now the Heritage Sites and Archaeology Division). She left the position in 2010, later explaining that further career advancement in the civil service would likely have required her to take on an administrative role.

Yangki led the development of Bhutan's Green Building Guidelines, Guidelines for the Conservation of Heritage Sites, Bhutanese Architecture Guidelines, and the National Spatial Policy of Bhutan. She coordinated or directed several major projects, including the restoration of the Paro Taktsang monastery after it partially burned in 1998 and the establishment of Bhutan's Folk Heritage Museum. She also led the design of the National Archives of Bhutan, galleries of the National Museum of Bhutan, and offices of the Royal Academy of Performing Arts, and the renovation of the Thimphu Memorial Chorten, Dechenphu Lhakang monastery, Trongsa Dzong, and Simtokha Dzong. She also designed one of the first Bhutanese-style houses in the United States, which has been featured in Architectural Digest and other publications.

Yangki was the first woman to be elected president of the Bhutan Association of Architects and the first woman to serve as chair of the South Asian Association for Regional Cooperation of Architects (SAARCH).

== Leadership and advocacy ==
Yangki has held a number of leadership positions in architectural associations and policy groups, including:

- Chair, South Asian Association for Regional Cooperation of Architects (SAARCA)
- President, Bhutan Institute of Architects
- Council Member, Bhutan Accreditation Council

She helped establish Bhutan's first professional registration system for architects through the Construction Development Board of Bhutan to ensure quality in the built environment of Bhutan. In her architectural work, Yangki has advocated for sustainable, biophilic design and the preservation of heritage.

== Lectures and publications ==
Yangki has spoken internationally on sustainability, heritage, and Bhutanese architecture. Notable lectures include:

- "Learning from Bhutan," National Building Museum, Washington DC (2009)
- "Culture: Pillars of Gross National Happiness," Asian Art Museum, San Francisco (2009)
- "Preservation of Heritage in Bhutan," Harvard GSD (2008)

Key publications include:

- Traditional Architectural Guidelines, Ministry of Works and Human Settlements
- Green Building Guidelines for Bhutan
- Dzong Architecture: Sacred Fortresses of the Himalayas
- Architectural Heritage in Bhutan, The Dragon's Gift
