= Social Service FC =

Bhutanese football club

- Full name: Social Service Football Club
- Founded: 1983; 43 years ago
- Ground: Changlimithang; Thimphu, Bhutan
- Capacity: 15,000
- League: Bhutan A-Division
- 1986: 2nd

Social Service Football Club is a football club from Bhutan, based at Changlimithang, who played in the inaugural Bhutan A-Division. Founded in 1983, then the top level of football in Bhutan, but since replaced by a full national league.

== History ==
They finished second in the inaugural season, winning eight of their nine games, with their only loss coming against eventual winners Royal Bhutan Army. They were defensively very tight throughout the whole competition, conceding only four goals, with only the Army team producing a better defensive record. The club still exists and plays its matches, but in the lower Bhutanese leagues.

== Achievements ==
- A-Division: 1 time runners-up

1986
