= Nima Sangay =

Bhutanese footballer (born 1984)

Personal information
- Full name: Nima Sangay
- Date of birth: 1 January 1984 (age 42)
- Place of birth: Thimphu, Bhutan
- Position: Midfielder

Team information
- Current team: Druk Pol

Senior career*
Years	Team	Apps	(Gls)
2003–	Druk Pol		

International career
2005–	Bhutan	12	(1)
- * Club domestic league appearances and goals

Nima Sangay is a Bhutanese footballer, who played for Druk Pol. He made his first appearance for the Bhutan national football team in 2005.

== Career statistics ==
=== International goals ===
#	Date	Venue	Opponent	Score	Result	Competition
1.	4 June 2008	Sugathadasa Stadium, Colombo, Sri Lanka	Bangladesh	1–1	Draw	2008 SAFF C.
Correct as of 21 July 2013
