= Ap Chuni Dorji =

Bhutanese poet

Ap Chuni Dorji is a Bhutanese poet and creator of the song "Yak Legpai Lhadar Gawo".

== The song ==
The song is about a handsome yak (Legpai Lhadar Gawo) who was ordered to be taken from his beloved herder and slaughtered for meat. Over the years, however, the lyrics and meaning of the song have been shortened and often reworded.

An English translation of Dorji's yak song:

"How beautiful is Yak Legpai Lhadar’s face!
Yak Legpai Lhadar – the god-sent calf!

There is no need to describe my place and paths,
If I were to explain my place and paths,
It is on the high snow-capped mountains
And the highland meadow of sershog flower
Where flower buds blossom. There, my home is.

I graze on mountains grass,
And drink fresh water of glacial lakes.
Should I dance my happiness,
I dance along the base of distant meadows.
One by one, the whole herd was slaughtered!
And I, the unfortunate Lhadar
It is I, Lhadar who feel sad.
A heavy command of a powerful lord came,
A man with a sword fastened at his waist
Came to take me, Lhadar.
Lhadar has no choice not to go.
When turn to be slaughtered is set
The turn fell on me, Lhadar.
Crossing mountains, a Highlander came.
And when the Highlander came,
The snow-covered peaks above, how high?
And Lhadar’s tree of life, how low?"
