= Yangchengphug College FC =

Bhutanese football club

Yangchengphug FC
- Full name: Yangchengphug College Football Club
- Founded: 1979; 47 years ago
- Ground: Changlimithang; Thimphu, Bhutan
- Capacity: 15,000
- League: Bhutan A-Division
- 1986: 9th

Yangchengphug College Football Club is a football club from Bhutan, based at Changlimithang. Founded in 1979, who played in the inaugural Bhutan A-Division, then the top level of football in Bhutan, but since replaced by a full national league.

== History ==
They finished ninth in the inaugural season, with a solitary win against T. I. and Power and two draws against Education and Motithang College to their name. They were also the weakest attacking force in the league together with Education, scoring just five goals in the whole competition. The club still exists and plays its matches, but in the lower Bhutanese leagues.
