= T. I. and Power FC =

Bhutanese football club

T. I. and Power
- Full name: T. I. and Power Football Club
- Dissolved: 1995; 31 years ago
- Ground: Changlimithang; Thimphu, Bhutan
- Capacity: 15,000
- League: Bhutan A-Division
- 1986: 8th

T. I. and Power Football Club was a football club from Bhutan, based at Changlimithang, who played in the inaugural Bhutan A-Division, then the top level of football in Bhutan, but since replaced by a full national league.

== History ==
They finished eighth in the inaugural season, with just a single victory over Health School and two draws against Public Works Department and Education to their name. They scored eleven goals in the whole competition, more than any other team outside the top three, but were defensively the weakest in the league, conceding twenty goals in total. There are no records available for any competitions held between 1987 and 1995 so it is not known whether they competed again, and there is no record of them competing in any future season for which records exist.
