= 1986 Bhutan A-Division =

A-Division
- Season: 1986
- Champions: Royal Bhutan Army
- Matches played: 45
- Goals scored: 128 (2.84 per match)
- Biggest home win: Royal Bhutan Army 5-1 Health School, Finance 5-1 Yangchengphug College, Finance 4-0 Education, Royal Bhutan Army 4-0 Education, Royal Bhutan Army 4-0 Public Works Department
- Biggest away win: Yangchengphug College 0-2 Public Works Department
- Highest scoring: Royal Bhutan Army 5-1 Health School, Finance 5-1 Yangchengphug College
- Longest winning run: 9 - Royal Bhutan Army
- Longest unbeaten run: 9 - Royal Bhutan Army

The 1986 season of the Bhutanese A-Division was the inaugural season of top-flight football in Bhutan. 10 teams competed, and the first championship was won by Royal Bhutan Army.

== League standings ==
| Pos | Team | Pld | W | D | L | GF | GA | GD | Pts |
|---|---|---|---|---|---|---|---|---|---|
| 1 | Royal Bhutan Army (C) | 9 | 9 | 0 | 0 | 24 | 2 | +22 | 27 |
| 2 | Social Service | 9 | 8 | 0 | 1 | 22 | 4 | +18 | 24 |
| 3 | Finance | 9 | 7 | 0 | 2 | 25 | 10 | +15 | 21 |
| 4 | Royal Bhutan Police | 9 | 4 | 2 | 3 | 12 | 7 | +5 | 14 |
| 5 | Public Works Department | 9 | 3 | 2 | 4 | 9 | 16 | −7 | 11 |
| 6 | Motithang College | 9 | 2 | 2 | 5 | 6 | 15 | −9 | 8 |
| 7 | Health School | 9 | 2 | 2 | 5 | 9 | 19 | −10 | 8 |
| 8 | T. I. and Power | 9 | 1 | 2 | 6 | 11 | 20 | −9 | 5 |
| 9 | Yangchengphug College | 9 | 1 | 2 | 6 | 5 | 17 | −12 | 5 |
| 10 | Education | 9 | 0 | 4 | 5 | 5 | 18 | −13 | 4 |

Updated to match(es) played on 31 July 2003. Source:
Rules for classification: 1) points; 2) goal difference; 3) number of goals scored.
(C) Champions

== Results ==
| Home \ Away | EDU | FIN | HEA | MOT | PWD | RBA | RBP | SOC | TIP | YAN |
|---|---|---|---|---|---|---|---|---|---|---|
| Education | | | 1–1 | 0–1 | 1–2 | | | | 2–2 | 0–0 |
| Finance | 4–0 | | 4–2 | 3–1 | 3–0 | | | | 3–1 | 5–1 |
| Health School | | | | | 0–1 | | | | 2–3 | |
| Motithang College | | | 1–2 | | 0–0 | | | | 1–0 | 1–1 |
| Public Works Department | | | | | | | | | 3–3 | |
| Royal Bhutan Army | 4–0 | 1–0 | 5–1 | 3–0 | 4–0 | | 2–1 | 1–0 | 2–0 | 2–0 |
| Royal Bhutan Police | 1–1 | 1–2 | 0–0 | 3–0 | 2–0 | | | | 2–1 | 2–0 |
| Social Service | 3–0 | 3–1 | 4–0 | 3–1 | 3–1 | | 1–0 | | 2–0 | 2–0 |
| T. I. and Power | | | | | | | | | | |
| Yangchengphug College | | | 0–1 | | 0–2 | | | | 3–1 | |

Updated to match(es) played on 31 Jul 2003. Source:
Note: Championship was played on a round robin basis, results are reported as per RSSSF, hence why some teams appear to have played more "home" games than others.
Legend: Blue = home team win; Yellow = draw; Red = away team win.
