= Ranjung United FC =

Bhutanese football club

Ranjung United
- Full name: Ranjung United Football Club
- Ground: Changlimithang; Thimphu, Bhutan
- Capacity: 45,000
- League: Bhutan A-Division
- 2003: 7th

Ranjung United Football Club was a football club from Bhutan, based at Changlimithang, that played in the Bhutan A-Division, then the top level of football in Bhutan, but since replaced by a full national league.

== History ==
They finished seventh in the 2003 season, with only one win, a 6–1 victory over Druk United, and three draws from their eight games. It is not known when they first entered the A-Division, as they were not playing in the B-Division in the previous season, and details on the A-Division are incomplete for both that season and the ones prior. It is also not known whether they competed again, and there is no record of them competing in any future season for which records exist.
