= Pema Dorji (footballer) =

Bhutanese footballer and manager

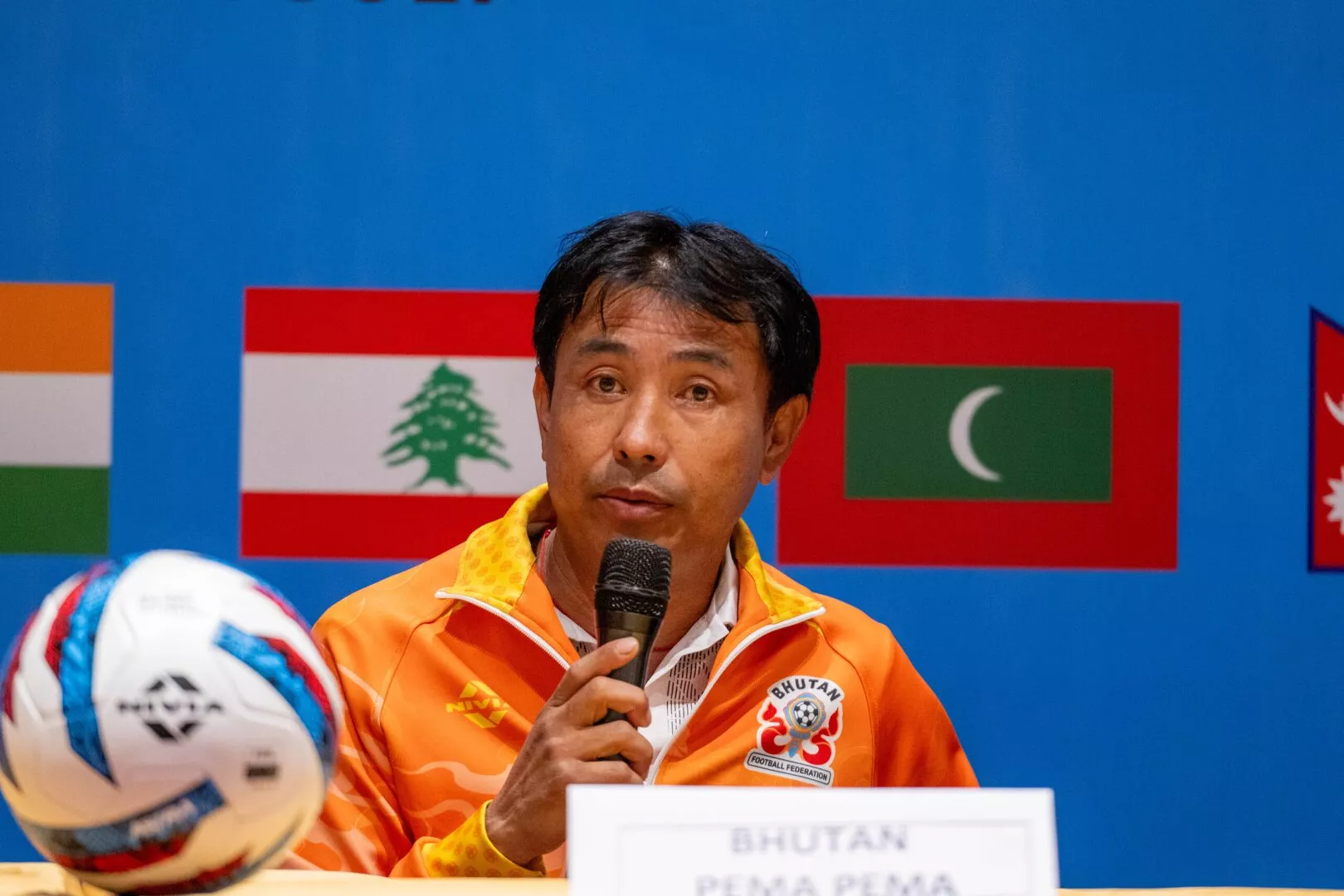

Personal information
- Full name: Pema Dorji
- Date of birth: 5 July 1985 (age 41)
- Place of birth: Bhutan
- Height: 1.68 m (5 ft 6 in)
- Position: Defender

Team information
- Current team: Tsirang (head coach)

Senior career*
Years	Team	Apps	(Gls)
2003–2007	Transport United		
2005–2014	Yeedzin FC		

International career
2002–2013	Bhutan	38	(0)

Managerial career
- 2014–2015: FC Terton
- 2015–2016: Bhutan
- 2019–2023: Bhutan
- 2024–2025: Transport United
- 2025–: Tsirang
- * Club domestic league appearances and goals

Pema Dorji (Dzongkha: དྲུང་འཚོ་པདྨ་རྡོ་རྗེ; born 5 July 1985) is a Bhutanese football coach and former footballer. A former international player, he made his first appearance for the Bhutan national football team in 2003.

Pema served as assistant coach to Japanese coach Norio Tsukitate during the first games of the Asian qualifiers for the 2018 FIFA World Cup until Tsukitate's tenure ended following a dispute with the team manager on 8 October 2015. Pema guided the team as interim coach in Bhutan's next match against Hong Kong on 13 October 2015.
