= 2008 SAFF Championship =

Tournament details
- Host countries: Maldives; Sri Lanka
- Dates: 3–14 June
- Venues: 2 (in 2 host cities)

Final positions
- Champions: Maldives (1st title)
- Runners-up: India

Tournament statistics
- Matches played: 15
- Goals scored: 43 (2.87 per match)
- Top scorer: (Afghanistan) H. A. Habib (4 goals)
- Best player: (Maldives) Ali Ashfaq

The 2008 South Asian Football Federation Championship was the seventh international association football championship for national teams from South Asia organised by the South Asian Football Federation. Hosted by the Maldives and Sri Lanka, the competition ran from 3 to 14 June 2008 and was contested by the national teams of Afghanistan, Bangladesh, Bhutan, India, the Maldives, Nepal, Pakistan and Sri Lanka.

The tournament began with the first matches of the group stage on 3 June 2008 and ended with the final on 14 June 2008. In a repeat of the 1997 final, India and the Maldives contested the final. A late goal from Mukhthar Naseer saw the Maldives run out 1–0 winners as they were crowned champions for the first time.

== Background ==
The first edition of the biennial South Asian Football Federation Championship, then known as the South Asian Association of Regional Co-operation Gold Cup, was held Lahore, Pakistan in 1993.

India were the defending champions after defeating Bangladesh 2–0 in the final. India were also the most successful team in the history of the tournament after winning four of the first six editions.

== Format ==
In total, eight teams took part in the competition. They were drawn into two single round robin groups of four teams. The group winners and runners-up would contest the semi-finals which would decide which teams contested the final and the third-place play-off.

=== Participants ===
- Afghanistan
- Bangladesh
- Bhutan
- India
- Maldives
- Nepal
- Pakistan
- Sri Lanka

== Venues ==
Matches were played at the Sugathadasa Stadium in Colombo and the Rasmee Dhandu Stadium in Malé.

Stadiums
Colombo	Malé
Sugathadasa Stadium	Rasmee Dhandu Stadium
Capacity:25,000	Capacity:11,850
Host city of Sri Lanka	Host city of Maldives
2008 SAFF Championship is located in Sri Lanka	2008 SAFF Championship is located in Maldives

== Group stage ==
=== Group A ===
India and the Maldives advanced to the semi-finals.

==== Table ====
Pos	Team	Pld	W	D	L	GF	GA	GD	Pts	Qualification
1	India	3	3	0	0	7	1	+6	9	Qualification for the semi-finals
2	Maldives	3	2	0	1	7	2	+5	6	Qualification for the semi-finals
3	Nepal	3	1	0	2	5	9	−4	3	
4	Pakistan	3	0	0	3	2	9	−7	0	

==== Matches ====
3 June 2008
16:00

India	4–0	Nepal
Pradeep 26'; Bhutia 34'; Chhetri 67'; Sushil 83'

Rasmee Dhandu Stadium, Malé
3 June 2008
21:00

Maldives	3–0	Pakistan
Shifan 45+2'; Thoriq 47'; Akram 90' (o.g.)

Rasmee Dhandu Stadium, Malé
Attendance: 15,000

5 June 2008
16:00

India	2–1	Pakistan
Pradeep 25'; Dias 45+1'		Ahmed 88'

Rasmee Dhandu Stadium, Malé
5 June 2008
21:00

Maldives	4–1	Nepal
Mohamed 9', 46'; Fazeel 50', 62'		Gouchan 10'

Rasmee Dhandu Stadium, Malé
Attendance: 8,000

7 June 2008
16:00

Pakistan	1–4	Nepal
Ishaq 52'		Tamang 3'; Rayamajhi 5'; Rai 67', 86'

Rasmee Dhandu Stadium, Malé
7 June 2008
21:00

Maldives	0–1	India
		Gouramangi 14'

Rasmee Dhandu Stadium, Malé
Attendance: 10,000

=== Group B ===
Sri Lanka and Bhutan advanced to the semi-finals.

==== Table ====
Pos	Team	Pld	W	D	L	GF	GA	GD	Pts	Qualification
1	Sri Lanka	3	2	1	0	5	2	+3	7	Qualification for the semi-finals
2	Bhutan	3	1	1	1	4	4	0	4	Qualification for the semi-finals
3	Bangladesh	3	0	2	1	3	4	−1	2	
4	Afghanistan	3	0	2	1	5	7	−2	2	

==== Matches ====
4 June 2008
16:30

Bangladesh	1–1	Bhutan
Baidya 27'		Sangay 79'

Sugathadasa Stadium, Colombo
4 June 2008
19:00

Sri Lanka	2–2	Afghanistan
Gunarathna 8'; Ediri 75' (pen.)		H. A. Habib 8', 49'

Sugathadasa Stadium, Colombo

6 June 2008
16:30

Bangladesh	2–2	Afghanistan
Ameli 51' (pen.); Mamunul 75'		H. A. Habib 9'; Hadid 22'

Sugathadasa Stadium, Colombo
6 June 2008
19:00

Sri Lanka	2–0	Bhutan
Gunarathna 25', 37'

Sugathadasa Stadium, Colombo

8 June 2008
17:00

Afghanistan	1–3	Bhutan
H. A. Habib 88'		Dorji 13'; Gyeltshen 31', 80'

Sugathadasa Stadium, Colombo
8 June 2008
19:30

Sri Lanka	1–0	Bangladesh
Mohideen 71'

Sugathadasa Stadium, Colombo

== Semi-finals ==
India defeated Bhutan afer extra time and the Maldives defeated Sri Lanka to advance to the final.

11 June 2008
16:00

India	2–1 (a.e.t.)	Bhutan
Chhetri 30'; Gouramangi 120'		Dorji 18'

Rasmee Dhandu Stadium, Malé
Attendance: 12,000

11 June 2008
19:00

Sri Lanka	0–1	Maldives
		Fazeel 70'

Sugathadasa Stadium, Colombo
Attendance: 12,000

== Final ==
Mukhthar Naseer scored the only goal as the Maldives defeated India 1–0.

14 June 2008
19:00

India	0–1	Maldives
		Naseer 87'

Sugathadasa Stadium, Colombo
