= The Other Final =

2003 documentary film by Johan Kramer

- Event: Friendly
Bhutan	Montserrat
4	0
- Date: 30 June 2002
- Venue: Changlimithang Stadium, Thimphu
- Referee: Steve Bennett (England)
- Attendance: 15,000

The Other Final is a 2003 documentary film, directed by Johan Kramer of Dutch communications agency KesselsKramer, about a football match between Bhutan and Montserrat, the then-lowest ranked teams in the FIFA World Rankings. The game was played in the Changlimithang Stadium, Thimphu, Bhutan on 30 June 2002, the same day as the 2002 FIFA World Cup final. Bhutan won the game 4–0, their first ever victory and the first time they had kept a clean sheet. The friendly match, officially sanctioned by FIFA, saw Bhutan rise out of the bottom two of the world rankings and kept Montserrat in last place. The referee was Englishman Steve Bennett.

== Background ==
Held on the same day as the World Cup Final, this alternative final featured the world’s lowest ranking teams of Bhutan and Montserrat. The project was conceived and filmed by KesselsKramer, with the intention of communicating that football needn’t be so focused on competition. Instead, this sport that crossed all national boundaries could be viewed as a means of bringing people together in fellowship.

— Statement from KesselsKramer on the purpose of the documentary.

In 2002, Montserrat were ranked last in the world FIFA rankings with Bhutan second last. Prior to their meeting, Bhutan, who first competed in 1982, had never won an official match (they had one victory over Tibet, who are not FIFA members so the match was not officially sanctioned), whilst Montserrat, who made their debut in 1950 had only managed two victories, both against Anguilla in the 1995 Caribbean Cup, in their entire history. Additionally, financial constraints and a slump in the popularity of the game in the 1980s and 1990s had impacted the development of the national team in Bhutan, as well as the fact that the low level of facilities in the country had prevented the team from attempting to qualify for the FIFA World Cup.

Montserrat had also suffered their own significant misfortunes, when the Soufrière Hills erupted causing widespread devastation to the island. Seismic activity had occurred in 1897–1898, 1933–1937, and again in 1966–1967, but the eruption that began on 18 July 1995 was the first since the 16th century in Montserrat. When pyroclastic flows and mudflows began occurring regularly, the capital, Plymouth, was evacuated, and a few weeks later a pyroclastic flow covered the city in several metres of debris. The British destroyer HMS Liverpool took a large role in evacuating Montserrat's population to other islands; these included Antigua and Barbuda, who warned they would not be able to cope with many more refugees. About 7,000 people, or two-thirds of the population, left Montserrat; 4,000 to the United Kingdom. These events understandably had a major impact on football in Montserrat and the team did not compete internationally for four years and when they returned they had to play all of their matches away from Montserrat after the eruptions had destroyed the only football stadium of an international standard.

At the same time, with the Netherlands having failed to qualify for the 2002 FIFA World Cup, two Dutch ad-agency partners, Johan Kramer and Matthijs de Jongh, not having their home team to cheer on pondered who the worst team in the world might be. (De Jongh: "That's the official version, but the real story behind it is that I had been in Bhutan in 2000 and 2001, and I was fascinated by the country and wanted to share it.") With Bhutan and Montserrat so close to each other at the bottom of the FIFA rankings, they set out to arrange a match between the two nations. The match was not as easily arranged as might initially be thought. Firstly, this match was being arranged by private individuals rather than by the relevant football federations during a normal international fixture window. Both sides thought that the idea was unrealistic in the beginning, and officials from both federations thought the initial suggestion of the match was a joke and had little knowledge of each other's countries. Johan Kramer said that he thought Montserrat were willing to agree to the friendly and to travel all the way to Bhutan because their government felt that the publicity from the match would counterbalance the reports about the volcanic eruptions on the island.

Three weeks prior to the match, Dutch coach Arie Schans flew out to Bhutan to take temporary charge of the side and took four hour long daily training sessions with the team in order to prepare them for the match. There was a considerable deal of anticipation in Thimphu prior to the game, though the Bhutan Football Federation sought to play down the importance of victory, saying it was more important to focus on participation than winning. However, both sets of players were very much focused on getting a result, Dinesh Chhetri said that Bhutan would win by at least two goals to nil, whereas Montserratian midfielder Antoine Lake-Willix thought they would win 3–0.

== Match report ==
30 June 2002
10:54

Bhutan	4–0	Montserrat
Dorji 4', 67', 78'; Chhetri 76'

Changlimithang Stadium, Thimphu
Attendance: 15,000
Referee: Steve Bennett (England)

The game started strongly for Montserrat and Bhutan struggled to keep them at bay during early exchanges, however, initial nerves were settled after five minutes when Wangay Dorji headed a goal to give Bhutan the lead. This gave them the momentum to press on, but their finishing was lax and they were unable to convert the chance they created. Montserrat were able to keep Bhutan at bay for the rest of the half and the game remained at 1–0 until well past the hour mark when referee, Steve Bennett awarded Bhutan a free-kick. Dorji stepped up and scored his second of the game. The momentum remained with Bhutan and veteran striker Dinesh Chhetri scored a third before Dorji took full advantage of a tiring Montserratian team to complete his hat trick and seal a 4–0 victory, Bhutan's first victory on the international stage against any opposition, indeed, their first ever result of any kind, and the first time they had ever kept a clean sheet. Overall, it seemed unlikely that Montserrat would be able to put up much of a fight, struggling as a team not only with the altitude, the game was played at 7,500 feet (2,300 m), Montserrat rarely troubled the Bhutanese goalkeeper, having only one shot of note, which Vladimir Farrell fired straight at the Bhutan goalkeeper. A crowd of 15,000 watched the game, which followed an hour-long dance program designed to showcase the Buddhist traditions of the country.

== Awards ==
The Other Final claimed two awards:

- Avignon Film Festival's best documentary (2003)
- Bermuda International Film Festival – Documentary Prize – Special Mention (2003)

== Still photography and photobook ==
In association with KesselsKramer, the Dutch photographer Hans van der Meer photographed the run-up in Bhutan to the match, and the match itself. The photographs were collected into a photobook, Bhutan–Montserrat: The Other Final. (Note: Hans van der Meer, Bhutan–Montserrat: The Other Final ([Amsterdam]: De Verbeelding, 2002; ISBN 90-74159-55-9). Text by Chris Barrett; text and captions in both English and Dzongkha.)

== See also ==
- List of association football films
