= Eintracht Baunatal =

German football club

GSV Eintracht Baunatal
- Full name: Großenritter Sportverein Eintracht Baunatal e.V.
- Founded: 1907
- League: Gruppenliga Kassel 1 (VII)
- 2018–19: Verbandsliga Hessen-Nord (VI), 15th (relegated)
Home colours	Away colours

Eintracht Baunatal is a German association football club from the city of Baunatal, Hesse.

== History ==
The club's roots go back to the establishment in 1907 of the gymnastics club Deutsche Turngemeinde Großenritter which formed a football department sometime in 1920. On 14 September 1933, TG merged with Sportverein Eintracht Großenritter to become Turn- und Sport 1907 Großenritter. Following World War II, on 1 July 1945, the memberships of TuS and the worker's clubs Arbeiter Turn- und Sportverein 1919 Großenritter and Radsportverein Solidarität Großenritter – both banned by the Nazis as politically unacceptable to the regime in 1933 – were joined to form Sportgemeinde Großenritter. The following year the club was renamed Turn- und Sportverein Eintracht Großenritter.

Eintracht played two seasons in the third tier Amateurliga Hessen in 1971–72 and 1973–74, being quickly relegated in both campaigns. In March 1983 the team took on its current name Großenritter Sportverein Eintracht Baunatal. They made one last appearance in the Amateuroberliga Hessen (III) in 1986–87.

In the 2015–16 and 2017–18 seasons the club won the league championship in the Gruppenliga Kassel 1 and earned promotion to the Verbandsliga Hessen-Nord, only to suffer relegation after each succeeding season.

== Honours ==
- Gruppenliga Kassel 1
  - Champions: 2015–16, 2017–18
