= Norio Tsukitate =

Japanese footballer and manager

Personal information
- Date of birth: 2 April 1960 (age 66)
- Place of birth: Aichi Prefecture, Japan

Youth career
- Toyota Nishi Senior High School

Senior career*
Years	Team	Apps	(Gls)
1979–1988	Toyota Motor Corp. SC		

Managerial career
- 1992–1994: Nagoya Grampus Eight
- 2002–2005: Shimizu S-Pulse youth
- 2005–2009: Guam
- 2013: Timor Leste U-19
- 2014: Laos
- 2014: Bangladesh women
- 2015: Bhutan
- 2018–2019: Timor Leste U-23
- 2018–2019: Timor Leste
- * Club domestic league appearances and goals

Norio Tsukitate (築舘 範男, Tsukitate Norio; born 2 April 1960) is a Japanese football manager and former player.

== Managerial career ==
=== Early career ===
Tsukitate coached the Nagoya Grampus and the youth team of Shimizu S-Pulse.

=== Guam national team ===
Tsukitate led the national team of Guam from February 2005 to 2009. The highlight of his Guamanian stint was when he led the team to winning the top of its group at the first round of the preliminary competition of the 2010 East Asian Football Championship held in March 2009.

=== Timor-Leste national under-19 team ===
The national under-19 team of Timor-Leste was led by Tsukitate during the 2013 AFF U-19 Youth Championship. Timor-Leste finished third at said tournament.

=== Bangladesh women's national team ===
In October 2014, Tsukitate was appointed as head coach of the women's national team of Bangladesh. This was his first time to coach a women's team. He was tasked to lead the team until the 2014 SAFF Women's Championship. He was also named adviser of the under-16 team for the 2015 AFC U-16 Women's Championship qualifiers.

=== Bhutan national team ===
Tsukitate was appointed coach of the Bhutan national team taking over from Chokey Nima who led the team through the first round of the 2018 FIFA World Cup qualifiers. His first task as coach was to lead the team through the second round of the qualifiers.

At his final game with Bhutan against Maldives in the qualifiers, he had a disagreement with Hishey Tshering, the team manager over the selection of starting players. Tsukitate claimed that Hishey was trying to take over his duties as head coach while Hishey said that he is expressing concerns of players being played in an unfamiliar position. Tsukitate left the team at half time after he was asked to leave by Hishey, who is also Vice President of the Bhutan Football Federation. Tsukitate's tenure as head coach of Bhutan ended. For the next qualifiers game, the Bhutanese national team was led by Tsukitate's assistant coach Pema who took over as interim head coach.

=== Timor Leste return ===
In May 2018, Tsukitate returned to Timor Leste to take charge of the senior team and the U-23 team.

== Coaching honours ==
Timor-Leste U19

- AFF U-19 Youth Championship Third place: 2013

Bangladesh (women's)

- SAFF Women's Championship Semifinalists: 2014
