= Dinesh Chhetri =

Bhutanese association football player

Personal information
- Place of birth: Bhutan
- Position: Forward

International career
Years	Team	Apps	(Gls)
2002–2003	Bhutan	14	(4)

Dinesh Chhetri is a Bhutanese former footballer who is last known to have played as a forward.

== Career ==
On 30 June 2002, Chhetri scored for Bhutan during The Other Final, 4–0 win over Montserrat, when they were the two lowest ranked national teams on the FIFA rankings.

== International goals ==
No.	Date	Venue	Opponent	Score	Result	Competition
1.	30 September 1999	Dasharath Rangasala, Kathmandu, Nepal	Pakistan	1–0	1–2	1999 South Asian Games
2.	27 April 2001	Mirpur Stadium, Dhaka, Bangladesh	Bangladesh	1–?	1–3	Friendly
3.	30 June 2002	Changlimithang Stadium, Thimphu, Bhutan	Montserrat	3–0	4–0	The Other Final
4.	23 April 2003	Changlimithang Stadium, Thimphu, Bhutan	Guam	3–0	6–0	2004 AFC Asian Cup qualification
