= Yeshey Gyeltshen =

Bhutanese footballer

Personal information
- Full name: Yeshey Gyeltshen
- Date of birth: February 11, 1983 (age 43)
- Place of birth: Bhutan
- Position: Forward

Team information
- Current team: Druk Star

Senior career*
Years	Team	Apps	(Gls)
2004–2006	Druk Pol		
2007	Druk Star		

International career
2008	Bhutan	6	(2)
- * Club domestic league appearances and goals

Yeshey Gyeltshen (born 11 February 1983) is a Bhutanese former footballer who played for Druk Star. He made his first appearance for the Bhutan national football team in 2009.

== Career statistics ==
=== International goals ===
#	Date	Venue	Opponent	Score	Result	Competition
1.	8 June 2008	Sugathadasa Stadium, Colombo, Sri Lanka	Afghanistan	1–3	Win	2008 SAFF C.
2.	8 June 2008	Sugathadasa Stadium, Colombo, Sri Lanka	Afghanistan	1–3	Win	2008 SAFF C.
Correct as of 21 July 2013
