= Wangay Dorji =

Bhutanese footballer

Personal information
- Full name: Wangay Dorji
- Date of birth: 9 January 1974 (age 52)
- Place of birth: Thimphu, Bhutan
- Height: 1.75 m (5 ft 9 in)
- Position: Forward

Senior career*
Years	Team	Apps	(Gls)
2000	Mohammedan		
2001–2002	Samtse		
2003–2004	Ranjung United		
2005	Druk Pol		
2006–2007	Transport United		

International career
2000–2013	Bhutan	14	(5)
- * Club domestic league appearances and goals

Wangay Dorji (born 9 January 1974) is a Bhutanese former professional footballer. He played as striker for Dhaka Mohammedan, Samtse, Ranjung United, Druk Pol and Transport United.

Dorji gained international fame after scoring a hat-trick against Montserrat in The Other Final. Bhutan won the match 4–0.

Dorji was captain of the Bhutanese national team.

== Career statistics ==
=== International goals ===
#	Date	Venue	Opponent	Score	Result	Competition
1.	30 June 2002	Changlimithang Stadium, Thimphu, Bhutan	Montserrat	1–0	4–0	Friendly
2.	30 June 2002	Changlimithang Stadium, Thimphu, Bhutan	Montserrat	2–0	4–0	Friendly
3.	30 June 2002	Changlimithang Stadium, Thimphu, Bhutan	Montserrat	4–0	4–0	Friendly
4.	23 April 2003	Changlimithang Stadium, Thimphu, Bhutan	Guam	1–0	6–0	2004 AFC Asian Cup qualification
5.	23 April 2003	Changlimithang Stadium, Thimphu, Bhutan	Guam	2–0	6–0	2004 AFC Asian Cup qualification
Correct as of 21 July 2013
