= Pema Dorji (doctor) =

Bhutanese doctor of traditional medicine

Pema Dorji (Dzongkha: དྲུང་འཚོ་པདྨ་རྡོ་རྗེ; 1936–2009) was a Bhutanese doctor (drungtsho) of traditional Bhutanese and Tibetan medicine, was the first person to institutionalize traditional medicine in Bhutan. He was the founding director of the National Indigenous Medicine Hospital and of the Institute of Indigenous Medicine in the capital Thimphu, and the key person behind the establishment of the Health Department's indigenous clinics and dispensaries in all 20 districts of Bhutan which make available free treatment and medicine to all the citizens of Bhutan.

== Biography ==
Pema Dorji was born in Tashi Dingkha in the Trongsa district of Bhutan in a family of traditional physicians. He began his medical studies in Kurtoe, Lhuntsi District, east Bhutan under Drungtsho Chimi Gyeltshen, his grandmother's brother who was the personal physician of Ashi Om, the Queen of Jigme Wangchuck.

In 1946, Pema Dorji left Bhutan to train as a Drungtsho (physician-pharmacist) at the renowned Chagpori traditional medical college in Lhasa, Tibet. There he spent seven years studying with some of the greatest masters of the Sowa Rigpa (gso ba rig pa) medical tradition. Qualifying in 1953 he returned to Bhutan where he worked for nine years under his uncle, Neten Tsewang Gyeltshen, in Trongsa Dzong.

In 1968, Drungtsho Sherab Jorden and Drungtsho Pema Dorji established the first traditional clinic and dispensary to be set up under the government at Dechencholing, near Thimphu. In 1971 training of Menpas was started there in 1974 and in 1978 training of Drungtshos. In 1979, he established the new National Indigenous Medicine Hospital in Kawangjangsa, Thimphu, which now forms part of the Institute of Traditional Medicine Services.

On June 2, 1999, Drungtsho Pema Dorji was decorated with the Druk Thugsey Award by Jigme Singye Wangchuck, the fourth king of Bhutan, for his service and bringing remarkable changes to the development of traditional medicine in Bhutan.

== Sources ==
- Report on a Bhutanese Traditional Doctor, Dungtsho Peme Dorji; in Tashi Delek [Druk Air's In-Flight Magazine], May–June 1998 issue.
