= Yeshey Dorji =

Bhutanese footballer (born 1989)

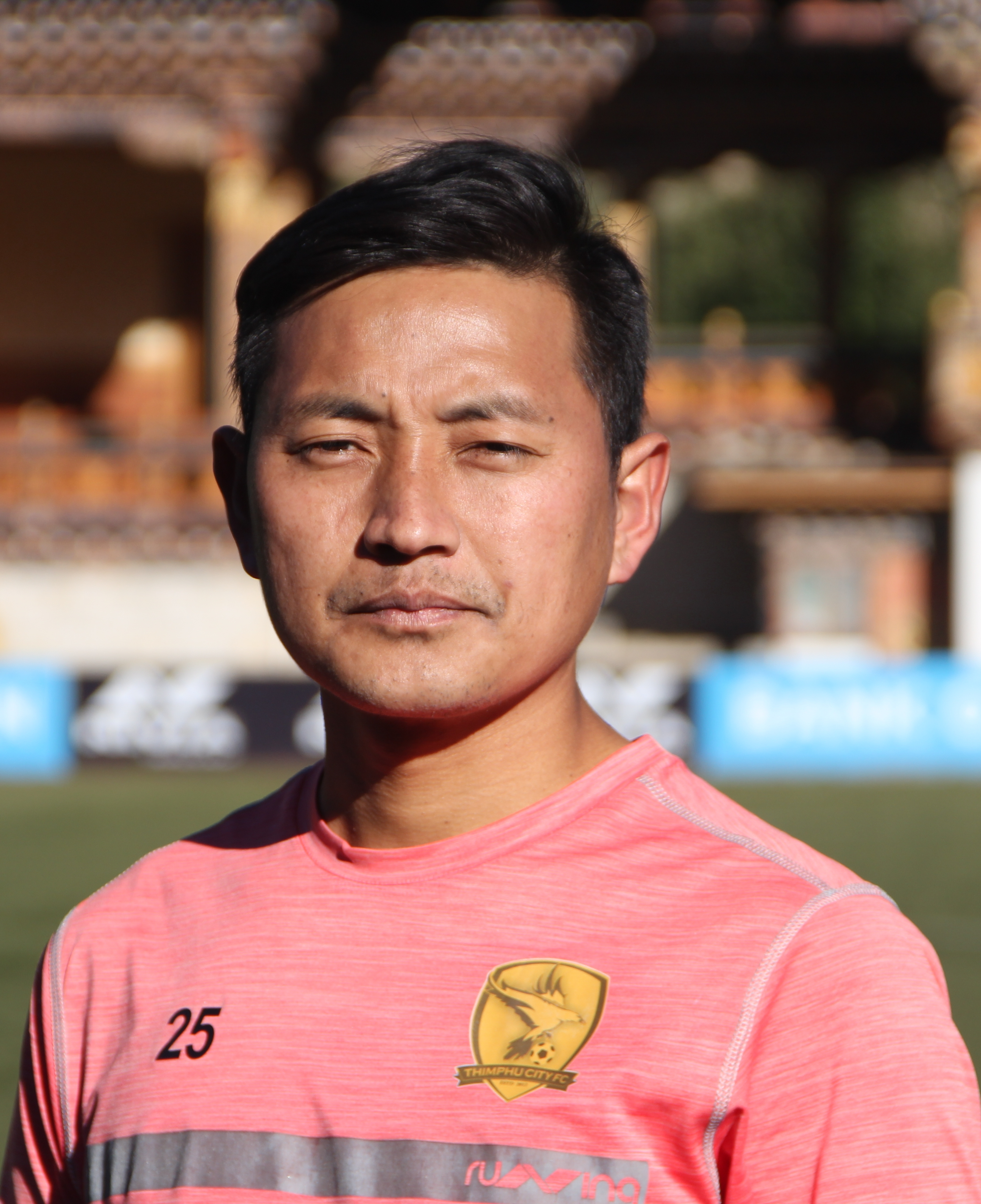

Personal information
- Full name: Yeshey Dorji
- Date of birth: January 2, 1989 (age 37)
- Place of birth: Thimphu, Bhutan
- Height: 1.78 m (5 ft 10 in)
- Position: Forward

Senior career*
Years	Team	Apps	(Gls)
2008–2014	Yeedzin		
2014–2018	Thimphu City		

International career
2008–2013	Bhutan	10	(1)
2013	Bhutan national futsal team	2	(0)
- * Club domestic league appearances and goals

Yeshey Dorji (born 2 January 1989), commonly known as "Bumlay", is a Bhutanese former international footballer. He made his first appearance for the Bhutan national football team in 2008. He is also a member of the Bhutan national futsal team. After the 2013 SAFF Championship he retired from international duty. Currently, he is contributing to the development of football in Bhutan through his work with the Bhutan Football Federation.

== Career statistics ==
=== International goals ===
#	Date	Venue	Opponent	Score	Result	Competition
1.	8 June 2008	Sugathadasa Stadium, Colombo, Sri Lanka	Afghanistan	1–3	Win	2008 SAFF C.
Correct as of 21 July 2013
