= Education FC =

Bhutanese football club

Education
- Full name: Education Football Club
- Founded: 1986; 40 years ago
- Dissolved: 1995; 31 years ago
- Ground: Changlimithang; Thimphu, Bhutan
- Capacity: 15,000
- League: Bhutan A-Division
- 1986: 10th

Education Football Club was a football club from Bhutan, based at Changlimithang, who played in the inaugural Bhutan A-Division, then the top level of football in Bhutan, but since replaced by a full national league.

== History ==
They finished tenth and last in the inaugural season, drawing four and losing five of their nine games. They finished as the equal lowest scorers for the season with Yangchengphug College with only five goals, but did manage to secure draws against Health School, T. I. and Power, Yangchengphug College and Royal Bhutan Police. There are no records available for any competitions held between 1987 and 1995 so it is not known whether they competed again, and there is no record of them competing in any future season for which records exist.
