= Kinley Dorji (footballer) =

Bhutanese former footballer and manager

Personal information
- Date of birth: August 30, 1986 (age 40)
- Place of birth: Thimphu, Bhutan
- Position: Midfielder

Senior career*
Years	Team	Apps	(Gls)
2001–2005	Thimphu		
2006–2007	Transport United		
2009–2011	Druk Star		
2012–2013	Yeedzin		
2014	Ugyen Academy		

International career
2008–2011	Bhutan	11	(1)

Managerial career
- 2013: Yeedzin
- 2014–2018: Ugyen Academy
- 2023–2024: Transport United
- * Club domestic league appearances and goals

Kinley Dorji (born August 30, 1986) is a Bhutanese former footballer and current manager. He made his first appearance for the Bhutan national football team in 2008.

== Career statistics ==
#	Date	Venue	Opponent	Score	Result	Competition
1.	June 11, 2008	Rasmee Dhandu Stadium, Malé, Maldives	India	2–1	Lost	2008 SAFF C.
Correct as of July 21, 2013
