= Dechen =

Origin
- Language: Classical Tibetan
- Origin: བདེ་ཆེན
- Meaning: Great bliss

Dechen (Tibetan: བདེ་ཆེན, Wylie: bde-chen, ZWPY: Dêqên, Jaques-IPA:bdʔe.tɕʰʔen) is a Tibetan name meaning "great bliss". It is a Tibetan translation of the Sanskrit term mahāsukha (महासुख). It is commonly used in Bhutan, Ladakh, Nepal and Tibet. People with the name Dechen include:

- Pabongkhapa Déchen Nyingpo (1878–1941), lama of the Gelug school
- Pema Dechen (1918–1991), third queen consort of Bhutan
- Dechen Wangmo (Tibetan Buddhist) (c. 1925–2011), daughter of a Tibetan noble family
- Dechen Shak-Dagsay (born 1959), singer of traditional Tibetan Buddhist mantras
- Dechen Wangmo (politician) (born c. 1976), Bhutanese politician who was made Minister for Health in November 2018
- Dechen Roder (born 1980), Bhutanese filmmaker
- Dechen Yangzom Wangchuck (born 1981), daughter of the fourth king of Bhutan
- Sonam Dechen Wangchuck (born 1981), daughter of the fourth king of Bhutan
- Dechen Pem (fl. 1993–present), Bhutanese singer
- Dechen Zangmo (fl. 2013–present), member of the National Assembly of Bhutan
