= Zangmo =

Zangmo is a surname. Notable people with the surname include:

- Dechen Zangmo, Bhutanese politician in office 2013–2018
- Neten Zangmo (born 1961), Bhutanese government official and politician
- Shukseb Jetsun Chönyi Zangmo (1852–1953), Tibetan Buddhist nun
- Tashi Zangmo (born 1963), Bhutanese activist

== See also ==
- Zango (disambiguation)
