= List of Bhutanese actors =

This is a list of actors born, or active in the acting field, in Bhutan.

== Male actors ==
- Jamyang Jamtsho Wangchuk
- Neten Chokling
- Kelly Dorji
- Sonam Kinga
- Orgyen Tobgyal
- Sangay Tsheltrim
- Rigzang

== Female actors ==
- Tsokye Tsomo Karchung
- Sonam Lhamo
- Dechen Pem
- Kezang Wangmo
- Tandin Bidha

== See also ==
- Cinema of Bhutan
