= Jordan River Crossing =

Sheikh Hussein Bridge מסוף נהר ירדן معبر نهر الأردن
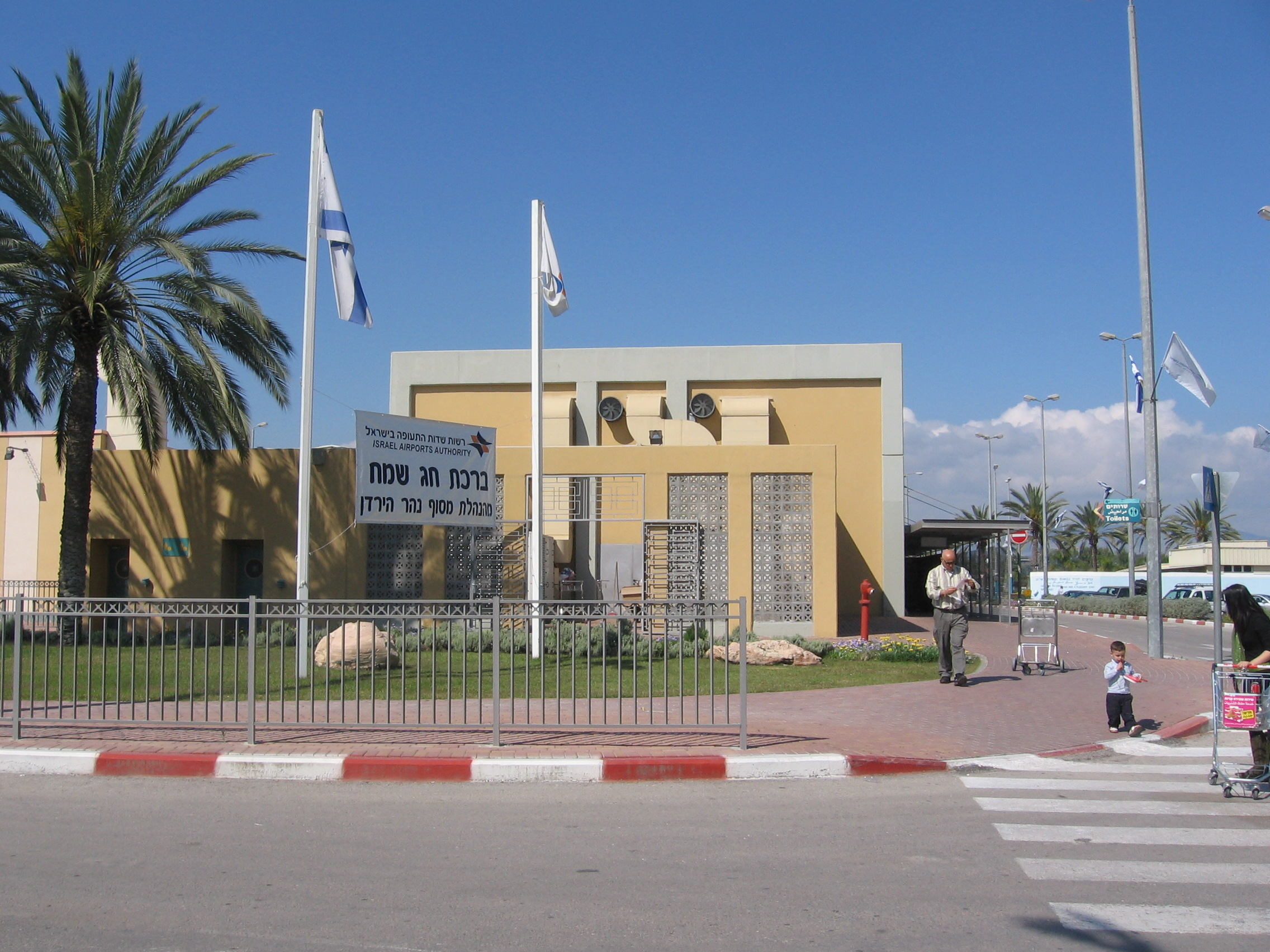
- Coordinates: 32°29′49″N 35°34′32″E
- Carries: Pedestrians, Vehicles, Containers
- Crosses: Jordan River
- Locale: Beit She'an, Israel; Irbid, Jordan
- Official name: Sheikh Hussein Bridge מסוף נהר ירדן معبر نهر الأردن
- Maintained by: Hashemite Kingdom of Jordan; Israel Airports Authority
- Website: www.iaa.gov.il/en-US/borders/NeharYarden/Pages/default.aspx

History
- Opened: November 1994

Statistics
- Daily traffic: 1,044 pedestrians in 2005; 103 vehicles in 2005
- Toll: JD10.00 (Outbound Jordan) ₪101.00 (Outbound Israel)

Location
- Interactive map of Sheikh Hussein Bridge מסוף נהר ירדן معبر نهر الأردن

The Jordan River Crossing (Hebrew: מסוף נהר ירדן, Arabic: معبر نهر الأردن) or Sheikh Hussein Bridge is the northern international border crossing between Jordan and Israel. It is located between Irbid, in Jordan, and Beit She'an, in Israel.

== Access ==
The Sheikh Hussein Bridge was opened in November 1994, and is the northernmost entry/exit point between Israel and Jordan.

=== Opening hours ===
The terminal operates throughout the year, excluding Yom Kippur and Islamic New Year.

The crossing is open for individuals (including tourists and private cars):

- Sunday-Thursday: 07:00 AM to 8:30 PM
- Friday and Saturday: 8:30 AM to 6:30 PM

Cargo terminal operating hours:

- Sunday-Thursday: 07:00 AM to 8:00 PM
- Friday and Saturday: cargo terminal is closed.

On weekends, those departing from Israel to Jordan by private vehicles can access the departure hall until 6pm.

=== Transportation ===
There is no public transportation to the terminal. Private bus companies do offer transportation to the crossing and across the border, such as the bus from Nazareth to Amman.

=== Across the bridge ===
Between the terminals, one must travel by car or bus.

A bus service between the two terminals is available every 25 minutes.

Privately owned Israeli cars may cross through the Israeli terminal and travel in Jordan after a change of license plates, registration and the payment of a tax at Jordan customs. For drivers entering with a private car, International Driving Permits can be issued at the MEMSI branch at the Israeli terminal.

Passing from Israel to Jordan by motorbike or bicycle is forbidden, but entering Israel from Jordan with a motorbike is allowed.

Rental cars may be left in the parking lot, which has a per day fee.

== Visa requirements ==
To use the Jordan River Crossing, all passports are required to be valid for at least 6 months. Jordanian visa is available on arrival to Israeli citizens, issued at the Jordanian terminal and costs JD10 for travellers who are planning to stay in Jordan for at least 3 nights and JD40 for travellers who are planning on staying there for a shorter period (a fee of JD120 is charged for multiple entry valid six months); however, all Israeli tourists visiting Jordan need to hire a escorting Jordanian guide in advance.

Israeli visa exemption applies to citizens of over 90 countries, who do not require a visa to enter Israel for a maximum stay of 3 months for tourism only, whereas Jordanian citizens must have an Israeli visa before arrival and confirmation to travel from the Israeli government is most likely required.

== Currency exchange ==
There are no ATMs at Israeli and Jordanian terminals. Exchange is available at the local banks at both the terminals after exit.
