= Jordanian nationality law =

Jordanian Nationality Law قانون الجنسية الاردنية

Parliament of Jordan
- Citation: No. 6 of 1954
- Territorial extent: Jordan
- Enacted: 16 February 1954
- Commenced: 16 February 1954
- Administered by: Ministry of Interior
- Status: Amended

The primary law governing nationality of Jordan is the Jordanian Nationality Law, which came into force on 16 February 1954.

Any person born to a Jordanian father is a Jordanian national at birth, regardless of the place of birth. Jordanian nationality is not transferrable to children of Jordanian mothers unless the fathers are stateless or their nationalities are unknown. Foreigners may become Jordanian nationals by naturalization after meeting a minimum residence requirement (usually four years) and demonstrating knowledge in the Arabic language. Individuals who make a substantial financial investment in the state are eligible for a facilitated naturalization process.

Jordan was formerly administered as a British protectorate as part of a League of Nations mandate for Palestine and Transjordan and local residents were British protected persons. Jordan gained independence in 1946 but the dissolution of the mandate for Palestine in 1948 and ensuing conflict led to the Jordanian annexation of the West Bank. Following its loss of the West Bank in 1967, Jordan severed all legal and administrative ties with that region in 1988, creating a set of complex nationality circumstances for the Palestinian inhabitants of both the West Bank and Jordan proper.

== Terminology ==
The distinction between the meaning of the terms citizenship and nationality is not always clear in the English language and differs by country. Generally, nationality refers a person's legal belonging to a state and is the common term used in international treaties when referring to members of a state; citizenship refers to the set of rights and duties a person has in that nation.

In the Jordanian context, the term "nationality" (جنسیة, jinsiyya) is used to refer to legal state membership, while "citizenship" (مواطنة, muwaatina) describes the relationship a person has with the state. Citizenship includes nationality but also involves other legal statues, civil rights, or political affiliations an individual might have.

== History ==
=== National status under British mandate ===
The region of Transjordan was conquered by the Ottoman Empire in 1517. Accordingly, Ottoman nationality law applied to the area. Transjordan was governed by the Ottomans for four centuries until the 1916–1918 Arab Revolt during the First World War. The area nominally remained an Ottoman territory following the conclusion of the war until 1922, when the United Kingdom obtained a League of Nations mandate for Palestine, which included Transjordan. Similarly, local residents ostensibly continued their status as Ottoman subjects. The terms of the mandate allowed Britain to exclude its application on certain parts of the region; this exclusion was exercised on the territory east of the Jordan River, where the Emirate of Transjordan was established.

The 1923 Treaty of Lausanne established the basis for separate nationalities in Transjordan and all other territories ceded by the Ottoman Empire. The 1928 Transjordanian Nationality Law confirmed the transition from Ottoman/Turkish to Transjordanian nationality in local legislation; all Ottoman/Turkish subjects who had been resident for at least 12 months in Transjordan on 6 August 1924 became Transjordanian nationals on 1 May 1928. Ottoman subjects born in Transjordan who had submitted applications to become Transjordanian before 6 August 1926 could acquire that nationality subject to discretionary approval of a designated "head supervisor". Foreigners could naturalize as Transjordanian nationals after residing in the territory for at least two years preceding an application, demonstrating proficiency in Arabic, affirming their intention to permanently reside in Transjordan, and satisfying a good character requirement.

Individuals who acquired foreign citizenship automatically lost Transjordanian nationality after receiving Cabinet approval, as well as any person who joined a foreign military without government approval. Children of a Transjordanian father automatically held Transjordanian nationality, and minor children likewise lost that nationality if their fathers ceased to hold that status. At age 18, they had the option of resuming Transjordanian nationality within two years. Any person who acquired Transjordanian nationality by birth could also voluntarily relinquish that status within one year of reaching the age of majority.

Standard regulations in the British Empire at the time strictly complied with the doctrine of coverture, where a woman's consent to marry a foreigner was also assumed to be intent to denaturalize. The 1928 Nationality Law mirrored this in Transjordanian nationality law; Transjordanian women who married foreign men automatically lost their Transjordanian nationality and foreign women who married Transjordanian men automatically became Transjordanian nationals. However, wives who had acquired or lost Transjordanian nationality through their marriage could elect to relinquish or reacquire that status within two years of their husbands' deaths or if they had ceased to be married.

Despite Britain's role in representing Transjordan internationally and its responsibility for territorial defense, domestic law treated the protectorate as foreign territory. Transjordanian nationals were treated as British protected persons, rather than British subjects, meaning that they were aliens in the United Kingdom. Protected persons could not travel to the UK without first requesting permission, but were afforded the same consular protection as British subjects when travelling outside of the British Empire. This arrangement continued until Transjordan gained independence in 1946 and the Emirate became the Hashemite Kingdom of Transjordan.

=== Post-independence policies and West Bank incorporation ===
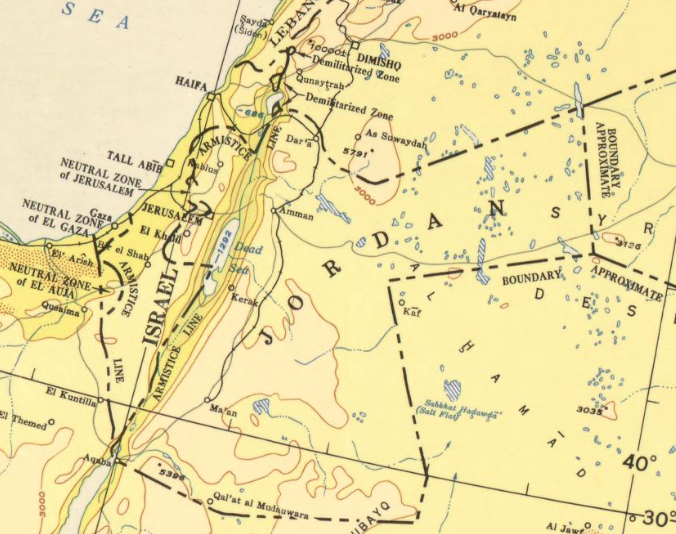
Jordan controlled the West Bank between 1948 and 1967. Palestinians resident in this territory were Jordanian nationals until 1988, when Jordan relinquished its claim over the region.

Following the 1948 Arab–Israeli War, Transjordan annexed the West Bank and the country was renamed as the Hashemite Kingdom of Jordan. Palestinian residents of the West Bank were granted Jordanian nationality through a supplementary nationality law enacted in December 1949 and participated in their first elections to the Jordanian parliament in 1950. This expansion of Jordanian territory greatly increased the country's population; compared to Transjordan's 1945 population of 476,000, the West Bank had 433,000 residents in 1947. Over 531,000 more people, displaced as a result of the war, entered Jordan by 1949. King Abdullah I's objective in quickly incorporating the Palestinian population into Jordanian institutions was to secure a vote in parliament calling for the unification of the East and West Banks. No actual vote on unification was ever voted on by the legislature; a failed parliamentary proposal to postpone immediate unification was instead interpreted by the government to be a vote for union. Palestinian dissatisfaction at the outcome and a perception that the King collaborated with Israel to fulfill his territorial ambitions led to his assassination in 1951.

The 1954 Nationality Law, which replaced the earlier 1928 legislation, clarified nationality eligibility for affected Palestinians. Every non-Jewish person who held Palestinian citizenship before termination of the British mandate for Palestine on 14 May 1948 who was ordinarily resident in Jordanian territory between 20 December 1949 and 16 February 1954 became Jordanian nationals under this legislation. This provision explicitly excluded any Jewish person who might have otherwise qualified to become Jordanian under the 1949 grant of nationality to Palestinians and served as a rejection of Revisionist Zionist claims to both sides of the Jordan River. The residence requirement for foreign nationals to naturalize was increased to four years and conviction of a crime violating "honor and morals" became a disqualifying factor, though Cabinet could waive the residence requirement (required royal approval from 1956) if the applicant was Arab or in special discretionary circumstances. Married women became eligible for naturalization separately from their husbands. Jordanian nationality could be stripped from any individual who entered government service of a foreign or enemy country and from naturalized persons (expanded to all Jordanians in 1958) who willfully acted against the national interest. The Ministry of Interior became the responsible agency for administering nationality, as opposed to the "head supervisor" specified in the 1928 law.

Non-Jordanian Arabs (defined as any national of an Arab League member state with an Arab father) faced greatly heightened residence requirements for naturalization, being required to live in the country for 15 years rather than four years for other foreign nationals. After receiving approval from the Minister of Interior, they were required to renounce their previous nationality and swear an oath of allegiance to the Jordanian monarch. However, Jordanians who intended to naturalize in another Arab country became able to do so without Cabinet approval while those who wished to in a non-Arab state were still required to obtain permission. A further definition for an "expatriate" was also detailed in this legislation to mean any Arab born in Jordan or the "usurped part of Palestine" who left the country, as well as their descendants. An expatriate could be granted Jordanian nationality after renouncing any other nationalities, subject to cabinet and royal approval. No elaboration is provided on the meaning of the "usurped part of Palestine" but left open the possibility of making residents of the Gaza Strip Jordanian nationals.

Regulations enforcing coverture were slightly relaxed in 1961. Jordanian women who married foreign men retain Jordanian nationality until they acquire the foreign citizenship of their husbands. Foreign women who married Jordanian men were allowed to remain foreign citizens instead of becoming Jordanian, provided that they made a written declaration to the Ministry of Interior within one year of marriage. Children continued to generally be assumed to have the same nationality as their father but certain exceptions were created in 1963 to prevent child statelessness. Minor children of Jordanian fathers who naturalized as foreign citizens but did not also acquire the citizenships of their fathers no longer lost Jordanian nationality. Instead, they became required to formally elect which nationality they would retain within two years of reaching age 18.

=== Territorial loss and subsequent reforms ===
Jordan lost control of the West Bank to Israel following the 1967 Six-Day War. Subsequently, 261,000 displaced Palestinians entered Jordan. Refugees who came from the West Bank remained Jordanian nationals but those who arrived from Gaza were treated as foreigners. Growing domestic support among Palestinians resident in Jordan for the Palestine Liberation Organization (PLO) and the persistence of a Palestinian national identity led to open rebellion against the monarchy in the 1970 Black September conflict. Despite government victory and King Hussein's attempts to mend ties between Transjordanians and Palestinians, the conflict led to an eventual permanent fracture between the two groups and failure of a pan-Jordanian identity.

Following the Arab League's 1974 recognition of the PLO as the legitimate representative authority of the Palestinian people, King Hussein reduced Palestinian representation in the National Assembly to 20 percent of parliamentary seats. Although the King had previously emphasized the ties between the East and West Banks, even describing Jordan as having become Palestine, persistent tension between Jordan and the PLO caused Hussein to view the Palestinians as a threat to the monarchy. Combined with Israeli government rhetoric that encouraged the "Jordan is Palestine" viewpoint in an effort to force migration of West Bank Palestinians to Jordan, the King's attitude towards the Palestinians became more tempered. Travel restrictions between the East and West Banks were introduced in 1983, along with colored identity documents required for any Palestinians resident in Jordan that tracked their origin and place of residence.

==== Formal disengagement from the West Bank ====
After the start of the First Intifada in December 1987, widespread popular support for the PLO led King Hussein to announce a full disengagement from the West Bank and the removal of all administrative and legal ties to the region, describing his decision as supportive of the Palestinian people's desire to secede from Jordan and to form a separate state. Any Jordanian national who was ordinarily resident in the West Bank on 31 July 1988 lost Jordanian nationality on that date and has since been considered as Palestinian citizens in Jordanian law. Minor children whose fathers were affected by the disengagement also lost Jordanian nationality. About 750,000 West Bank residents became effectively stateless. Parliament was dissolved and all legislative seats representing the West Bank were removed.

Although nationality loss as announced by the King was only supposed to affect West Bank residents, the implementation of the disengagement has in practice affected many Palestinians of West Bank descent who reside elsewhere in Jordan. Because regulations concerning nationality loss resulting from the West Bank withdrawal have never been enacted in legislation, the method of determining whether an individual is Palestinian is legally ambiguous. An affected person would not be aware that they had ceased to be Jordanian until they applied for passport renewal or had a child.

Despite the end of formal disengagement, nationality revocation from Palestinians continued in subsequent years; more than 2,700 people lost Jordanian nationality between 2004 and 2008. Persistent apprehension over Jordan becoming a second Palestinian homeland, an economic downturn after Jordan's foreign debt default in 1989, as well as a concerted effort to reduce Palestinian representation in the Jordanian government have contributed to the continued revocations post-disengagement. Government officials have portrayed the disengagement as a way of halting Israeli settlement of the West Bank by preventing further displacement of Palestinians from the territory.

==== Multiple citizenship and familial access to nationality ====
Restrictions on holding multiple nationalities were repealed in 1987 and any Jordanian national who obtained another citizenship no longer automatically lost their Jordanian nationality. Former Jordanians who lost that status before 1987 may apply for nationality restoration, but previously naturalized Jordanians who acquired another citizenship have no path to reacquire Jordanian nationality. Women and children no longer automatically lose Jordanian nationality following their husbands' or fathers' loss of that status. Foreign women could instead apply to obtain Jordanian nationality within five years of marriage, or three years if they are Arab. Jordanian women marrying foreign men retain their Jordanian nationality but may voluntarily renounce it at any time. They may subsequently reapply for Jordanian nationality on dissolution of marriage or deaths of their husbands. Minor children of Jordanian fathers who acquire foreign citizenship also no longer automatically lose Jordanian nationality on their fathers' denaturalization.

Jordanian nationality remains transferrable by descent only through Jordanian fathers and not mothers. Despite Jordan's accession to the Convention on the Elimination of All Forms of Discrimination Against Women in 1980, it has opted out of treaty provisions that guarantee equal citizenship rights. Children of Jordanian women married to foreign men do not have an automatic right to live or work in the country. Since 2015, affected individuals have been able to apply for a limited set of civil rights if their mothers have been resident in Jordan for at least five years which include eligibility to obtain residence permits, apply for driving licenses, purchase real estate, and receive state and welfare benefits. While 355,923 children qualified for the entitlement, less than 20 percent had received identity documents reflecting their special status by 2018. Of the 88,983 affected Jordanian women, 55,606 of them are married to Palestinian men.

==== Nationality by investment ====
In 1999, a nationality by investment pathway was created to attract foreign investment into the country. The original version of this program allowed Arab investors three ways with which they could qualify for Jordanian nationality. Candidates could invest in industrial sectors of the economy (other than real estate and stocks) through a US$500,000 deposit with the Central Bank of Jordan that created or maintained at least 10 jobs for local Jordanians. They could also choose to make a five-year annual deposit of at least US$750,000 at the Central Bank without interest. Alternatively, investors could also create or provide capital for industrial projects valued at least US$500,000. Iraqis who entered Jordan following the 2003 invasion of Iraq qualified for nationality by investment under similar terms, although the exact terms have never been publicly released.

This program was amended in 2018 with expanded investment options but raised capital requirements. Investors could make a five-year deposit at the Central Bank of at least US$1.5 million, purchase Jordanian bonds of an equivalent amount, or hold domestic securities of the same value. They also could invest US$1 million in Jordanian small and medium-sized enterprises for at least five years, or create an investment project operating for at least three years that provided 20 jobs and valued at US$2 million if located in Amman or US$1.5 million in another part of Jordan. Investors choosing any of these options were also eligible for permanent residency after purchasing a residence valued at least 200,000 JOD that must be retained for at least 10 years.

This pathway was again updated in 2019 with an annual limit of 500 candidates who are additionally required to pass background checks. In this version of the program, investors can make a three-year deposit at the Central Bank of at least US$1 million and must also purchase Jordanian bonds of an equivalent amount to be held for six years. Another option is to hold domestic securities valued at least US$1 million and also invest US$750,000 in small and medium Jordanian businesses for at least three years. Alternatively, they can create an investment project operating for at least three years that provided 20 jobs and valued at US$1.5 million if located in Amman or US$1 million in another part of Jordan. If holding a stake in an existing investment project, the share of the project that the investor holds must be worth at least US$1 million if located in the capital or US$700,000 in other governorates, and the project must have maintained 20 jobs for the preceding three years if in Amman (15 jobs elsewhere in Jordan). Any successful applicants who obtain Jordanian nationality through this path may also naturalize their spouse, unmarried daughters of any age, and unmarried sons under age 18. Individuals who have invested more than US$3 million in Jordan may also acquire Jordanian nationality for their sons under age 30, and their sons' wives and children.

== Acquisition and loss of nationality ==
=== Entitlement by descent ===
Individuals born to a Jordanian father are automatically Jordanian nationals at birth regardless of birthplace. The status is not transferrable by descent to children of Jordanian mothers unless the fathers are stateless or their nationalities are unknown. For nationality purposes, Palestinian fathers are never recognized as stateless whether they hold citizenship of any state or not. Abandoned children found in Jordan with unclear parentage are assumed to be Jordanian.

=== Voluntary acquisition ===
Foreigners may naturalize as Jordanian nationals after residing in the country for at least four years. Applicants must demonstrate proficiency in the Arabic language, fulfill a good character requirement, show intent to permanently reside in Jordan, and hold positions in occupations that do not compete with Jordanians. The Cabinet of Jordan has absolute discretion in approving or denying a grant of naturalization, and may additionally waive the residence requirement for Arab applicants or under exceptional circumstances that benefit the state. Foreign investors qualify for an expedited naturalisation process after making substantial capital investments in the country, subject to the requirements of the Jordan Investment Commission.

Noncitizen women married to Jordanian men may acquire nationality by naturalization after five years of marriage. The marriage time requirement is reduced to three years for women who are nationals of an Arab League member state. This facilitated pathway to nationality does not extend to foreign men married to Jordanian women. Ordinarily, Arab League nationals with an Arab father are only eligible for a grant of citizenship after residing in Jordan for 15 years, subject to a recommendation by the Minister of Interior and subsequent approval by Cabinet.

=== Relinquishment and deprivation ===
Jordanian nationality can be relinquished by making a declaration of renunciation provided that the declarant intends to naturalize in another country. This is subject to final approval by the Minister of Interior, unless the intended destination country is another Arab League state. Jordanian women who marry foreign men may similarly renounce their nationality by declaration. Jordanian nationality may be involuntarily removed from persons who: enlist in a foreign military without obtaining prior government permission, take employment in a foreign civil service, enter government service of an enemy state, fraudulently acquired naturalization, or willfully perform overt acts against national security. Individuals who enter a foreign military or civil service of a non-enemy state may retain their nationality if they leave foreign service when requested by the Jordanian government. Naturalized persons who lost Jordanian nationality after acquiring foreign citizenship before 1987 are prohibited from regaining Jordanian nationality.

== See also ==
- Visa policy of Jordan
- Visa requirements for Jordanian citizens
