= Wangmo =

Wangmo (Tibetan: དབང་མོ, Wylie: dbang mo) is a Tibetan name. People with this name include:

- Dechen Wangmo (Tibetan Buddhist) (died 2011), daughter of a Tibetan noble family
- Dechen Wangmo (politician) (born c. 1956), Bhutanese politician
- Dorji Wangmo (born 1955), Queen Mother of Bhutan
- Dorjee Wangmo (born c. 1988), Bhutanese politician
- Kezang Wangmo, Bhutanese actress, poet, singer and dancer
- Kelsang Wangmo (born Kerstin Brummenbaum, c. 1960), German Buddhist nun
- Kunzang Dekyong Wangmo (1892–1940), Tibetan Buddhist teacher
- Mayeum Choying Wangmo Dorji (1897–1994), mother of Queen Grandmother Ashi Kesang Choden of Bhutan
- Nilza Wangmo (born c. 1979), Indian restaurateur from Ladakh
- Rani Parvati Devi Deskit Wangmo (born 1934), Queen mother of Ladakh and Ladakh politician
- Tamdrin Wangmo Kelzang Chokyi Nyima (1836–1896), Tibetan Buddhist teacher
- Tashi Wangmo (born c. 1973), Bhutanese politician
- Tsering Wangmo Dhompa (born 1969), Tibetan poet
- Tsering Wangmo Satho (born 1967), Tibetan dancer and opera singer

== See also ==
- Wangmo County in China
