= Rinchen =

- Gender: Unisex
- Language: Tibetan, Mongolian

Origin
- Language: Tibetan
- Meaning: Treasure

Other names
- Alternative spelling: Rinchin, Renchin, Erinchin

Tibetan name
- Tibetan: རིན་ཆེན
- Wylie: rin chen

Mongolian name
- Mongolian Cyrillic: Ринчен
- Mongolian script: ᠷᠢᠨᠴᠢᠨ

Rinchen, meaning "treasure", is a Tibetan name, used by speakers of various Tibetic languages. It is also used as a given name by Mongols, seen as early as the Yuan dynasty. As a Mongolian name, it has various spellings such as Rinchin, Renchin, or Erinchin. People with Rinchen as one of their given names, or as a patronymic, include:

== Buddhist leaders and teachers ==
- Rinchen Chok of Ma (fl. 8th century), one of the disciples of Padmasambhava
- Rinchen Zangpo (958–1055), translator of Sanskrit Buddhist texts into Tibetan
- Yeshe Rinchen (1248–1294), Imperial Preceptor at the court of the Yuan dynasty
- Rinchen Gyaltsen (c. 1257–1305), ruler of the Sakya school
- Buton Rinchen Drub (1290–1364), eleventh abbot of Shalu Monastery
- Gendün Rinchen (1926–1997), 69th Je Khenpo of Bhutan
- Sonam Rinchen (1933–2013), teacher of Buddhist philosophy and practice in Dharamshala, India

== Mongol nobility ==
- Rinchinbal Khan (1326–1332), tenth emperor of the Yuan dynasty
- Erinchin Lobsang Tayiji (fl. 1662–1682), prince of the Khalkha federation of Western Mongolia
- Sengge Rinchen (1811–1865), Qing dynasty nobleman and general from Inner Mongolia

== Other ==
- Byambyn Rinchen (1905–1977), Mongolian scholar of linguistics and literature
- Chewang Rinchen (1931–1997), Indian army officer from Ladakh
- Rinchen Lhamo (1901–1929), writer from Kham who settled in the United Kingdom
- Rinchen Barsbold (born 1935), Mongolian paleontologist
- Ngawang Rinchen (born 1984), Chinese actor
- Pema Rinchen (born 1986), Bhutanese footballer
- Rinchen Maarkhane Moktan Tamang (born 2003), Indian MMA Fighter, from Darjeeling.

== See also ==
- Renchinlkhümbe, a sum (district) in Khövsgöl, northern Mongolia
- Rinchen Subtso, a lake in Shigatse Prefecture, Tibet Autonomous Region, China
- Rinchenia, a genus of Dinosauria named after Rinchen Barsbold
