= Tibetan name =

Tibetan names are typically consist of two juxtaposed elements.

Family names are rare among Tibetans, except for those of aristocratic ancestry, and come before the personal name (but diaspora Tibetans living in societies that expect a surname may adopt one). For example, in Ngapoi Ngawang Jigme, Ngapoi was his family name and Nga-Wang Jigmê his personal name.

Tibetan nomads (drokpa) also use clan names; in farming communities, they are now rare and may be replaced by household name.

Tibetan culture is patrilineal; descent is claimed from the four ancient clans that are said to have originally inhabited Ancient Tibet: Se, Rmu, Stong and Ldong. The ancient clan system of Tibet is called rus-ba (རུས་པ), meaning bone or bone lineage. The four clans were further divided into branches which are Dbra, Vgru, Ldong, Lga, Dbas and Brdav. With inter-clan marriages, the subclans were divided into many sub-branches.

While Tibetans from Kham and Amdo use their clan names as surnames, most farming communities in Central Tibet stopped using their clan names centuries ago and instead use household names.

Traditionally, personal names are bestowed upon a child by lamas, who often incorporate an element of their own name. In the Tibetan diaspora, Tibetans often turn to the Dalai Lama for names for their children. As a result, the exile community has an overwhelming population of boys and girls whose first name is "Tenzin", the personal first name of the 14th Dalai Lama.

Personal names are in most cases composed of readily understood Tibetan words. Most personal names may be given to either males or females. Only a few are specifically male or female.

Meanings of some of the common names are listed below:

Tibetan	Wylie	ZWPY	Chinese	English Common Spelling	Meaning	Reference
བསྟན་འཛིན	bstan 'dzin	Dänzin	丹增	Tenzin, Tenzing	Holder of Buddha Dharma	
རྒྱ་མཚོ	rgya mtsho	Gyamco	嘉措	Gyatso	Ocean	
སྐལ་བཟང	skal bzang	Gaisang	格桑	Kelsang	Good destiny, Good luck, Golden age, Flower	
ཉི་མ	nyi ma	Nyima	尼玛	Nyima	Sun, Day, Sunday	
རྡོ་རྗེ	rdo rje	Duo Jie	多吉，多杰	Dorji	Indestructible, Invincible, Vajra	
དོན་གྲུབ	don grub	Dang Zhou	顿珠	Dhondup	Wish come true	
མེ་ཏོག	me tog		梅朵	Medo	Flower	
ལྷ་མོ	lha mo		拉姆，拉莫	Lhamo	Princess, Goddess, Tibetan opera	
སྒྲོལ་མ	sgrol ma	Drölma	卓玛	Dolma	Tara, Goddess	
པད་མ	pad ma	Pema	贝玛，白玛	Pema	Lotus	
ཚེ་རིང	tshe ring	Cering	才仁	Tsering	Long life	
རྒྱལ་མཚན	rgyal mtshan		坚赞	Gyaltsen	Banner of victory, Dhvaja	
ཡེ་ཤེས	ye shes	Yêxê	伊喜，益西	Yeshe	Wisdom, Jnana	
བསོད་ནམས	bsod nams	Soinam	索南，索朗	Sonam	Merit, Virtue	
བདེ་སྐྱིད	bde skyid	Têci	德吉	Diki	Happiness	
ཟླ་བ	zla wa	Dawa	达娃	Dawa	Moon, Month, Monday	
བཀྲ་ཤིས	bkra shis	Zhaxi	扎西	Tashi	Auspiciousness, Good fortune	
བདེ་ལེགས	bde legs		德勒	Delek, Deleh	Bliss, Happiness	
རིན་ཆེན	rin chen		仁钦	Rinchen	Treasure, Precious Jewel, Gem	
དབང་མོ	dbang mo	Wangmô	旺姆	Wangmo	Lady with wealth and luck	
བདེ་ཆེན	bde chen	Dêqên	德钦，德千	Dechen	Great bliss	

Other common Tibetan names include Bhuti, Choedon, Choekyi, Chogden, Subash Lama, Chokphel, Damchoe, Dasel, Dema, Dhondup, Dolkar, Gyurmey, Jampa, Jangchup, Jungney, Kalden, Khando, Karma, Kunchok, Kunga, Lekhshey, Lhakpa, Lhakyi, Lhami, Lhawang, Lobsang, Metok, Namdak, Namdol, Namgyal, Ngonga, Norbu, Paljor, Pasang, Peldun, Phuntsok, Phurpa, Rabgang, Rabgyal, Rabten, Rangdol, Rigsang, Rigzin, Samdup, Sangyal, Thinley, Tsomo, Tsundue, Wangchuk, Wangyag, Woeser, Woeten, Yangdol, Yangkey, and Yonten.

Sherpa names are similar to Tibetan names, as the Sherpa language is closely related to Tibetan, but they have unique features and characteristics.
