= Pema =

Pema (Tibetan: པད་མ or པདྨ; Wylie: pad ma) is a Tibetan name meaning "lotus", which originated as a loanword from Sanskrit padma. People who have this name as one of their given names include:

== Buddhist teachers and leaders ==
- Pema Lingpa (1450–1521), Bhutanese saint
- Pema Rigdzin, 1st Dzogchen Rinpoche (1625–1697), first Dzogchen Rinpoche of Tibet
- Nyala Pema Dündul (1816–1872), teacher of Dzogchen and Tantric Buddhism in Eastern Tibet
- Pema Trinle (1874–1950), teacher of the Sakya tradition
- Gomchen Pema Chewang Tamang (1918–1966), Sikkimese Buddhist scholar
- Pema Chödrön (born Deirdre Blomfield-Brown, 1936), American nun
- Pema Tönyö Nyinje (born 1954), the 12th Tai Situpa
- Jigmet Pema Wangchen (born 1963), the 12th Gyalwang Drukpa

== Royalty ==
- Tsundue Pema Lhamo (1886–1922), first queen consort of Bhutan
- Pema Dechen (1918–1991), third queen consort of Bhutan
- Jetsun Pema (born 1990), queen consort of Bhutan since 2011

== Sportspeople ==
- Pema Tshering (born 1951), Bhutanese archer
- Pema Chophel (born 1981), Bhutanese footballer
- Pema Dorji (footballer) (born 1985), Bhutanese footballer
- Pema Rinchen (born 1986), Bhutanese footballer
- Pema Diki Sherpa (born 1988), Nepalese mountain climber

== Other ==
- Pema Dorji (doctor) (1936–2009), practitioner of traditional Bhutanese medicine
- Jetsun Pema (born 1940), sister of the 14th Dalai Lama
- Pema Dhondup (fl. 1940s–present), Nepalese film director
- Pema Gyamtsho (born 1961), Bhutanese politician
- Pema Tseden (born 1969), Chinese film director
- Pema Dakpa (born c. 1969), Bhutanese politician
- Pema Khandu (born 1979), Indian politician, Chief Minister of Arunachal Pradesh

== See also ==
- Padma (disambiguation)
