= Sherpa names =

Personal names used by the Sherpa people

Sherpa names, used by the Sherpa people, a Tibetan ethnic group, are closely related to Tibetan names, but have unique features and characteristics. Traditionally, Sherpa personal names consist solely of one or two given names. Surnames are uncommon among the Sherpa. When the need for a surname arises, many Sherpa individuals use the word "Sherpa" as a surname. Sherpas are often named after the weekday on which they were born; names with religious meaning are also frequent. Additional given names may be adopted over the course of a person's life. Many Sherpa names are gender-neutral and can be given to both male and female individuals.

== Sherpa given names ==
Sherpa given names are either derived from the seven days of the week or from religious motives. Most commonly, Sherpa individuals are assigned two given names at birth, although some have only one given name.

The Sherpa language is primarily a spoken language. While it is occasionally written using either the Devanagari or Tibetan script, there is no generally accepted convention for writing specific words and no standardized method for transcribing it into the Latin alphabet. For this reason, multiple Latin spellings are in use for some Sherpa names. For example, the name Mingma is also sometimes spelled "Mingmar", "Migmar", and "Mikmar".

=== Names based on weekdays ===
Many Sherpas are named after the weekday on which they were born. In the Sherpa language, each weekday shares its name with a celestial body of the solar system. The person bearing the name is said to be under the protective power of this celestial body, and this protection is re-affirmed every time the name is spoken.

The following table provides an overview of the days of the week, the corresponding Sherpa names, and the celestial bodies associated with each day. All of these names are gender-neutral and can be given to male and female children, which means it is not possible to determine the bearer's gender from the name.

Name	Weekday	Associated celestial body
Dawa	Monday	Moon
Mingma	Tuesday	Mars
Lhakpa	Wednesday	Mercury
Phurba	Thursday	Jupiter
Pasang	Friday	Venus
Pemba	Saturday	Saturn
Nyima	Sunday	Sun

=== Religious names ===
Names with religious meaning are common among the Sherpa. These names are often derived from Tibetan Buddhism and denote religious virtues, for example, Dorje ("thunderbolt"), Temba ("reliable"), or Tashi ("good luck", "happiness"). If the name belongs to a saint or a deity (for example, Dolma or Lhamo) those bearing the name are also placed under their protection.

Unlike the names derived from weekdays, most religious names are assigned to a specific gender. For example, the name Appa is given only to men, and the name Dolma only to women. Some names are used for both genders. In rare cases, there are also names with both a masculine and a feminine form. For example, the masculine name Jangbu (alternative spellings: Dzangbu, Zangbu) has a feminine counterpart, Jangmu (alternative spellings: Dzangmo, Zangmo).

For Sherpa individuals with two given names, the first name can be shortened to its first syllable, examples include Phu-dorje (instead of Phurba Dorje) and Da-phuti (instead of Dawa Phuti).

=== Name additions and changes ===
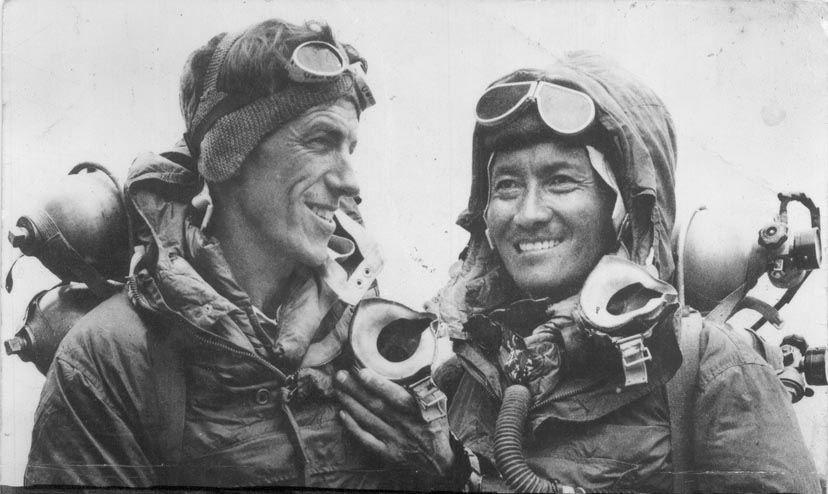
Tenzing Norgay (right), who was the first person to reach the summit of Mount Everest together with Edmund Hillary (left), was originally named Namgyal Wangdi at birth.

After the birth of a Sherpa child, a spiritual name-giving ceremony takes place, in which the child is blessed with a name by a local lama. However, Sherpas can adopt a new name or completely change their name at any time in their life, irrespective of marital status or other factors. The adoption of a new name also happens through a name-changing ceremony conducted by a lama.

Name changes at a later point in a Sherpa's life are particularly common when they have suffered from problems such as a serious illness, persistent bad luck, or a series of accidents. In such cases, the Sherpa hope that bearing a new name will bring a better future. For instance, Sherpa Tenzing Norgay, one of the first two people to reach the summit of Mount Everest, was born Namgyal Wangdi. After he became chronically ill as a child, his parents asked a lama to give him a new name. The lama recognized him as the reincarnation of a recently deceased, wealthy man, and gave him the names Tenzing (roughly "supporter of religion") and Norgay ("rich").

Sherpa names can be prefixed with the particle "ang". It functions as a diminutive and means "little" or "beloved". "Ang" is not used as a name on its own.

== Surnames ==
Traditionally, the Sherpa do not use surnames. The practice of identifying one's family affiliation through a shared family name is unknown in their culture. A name identifies the individual person, not the person as part of a family. Consequently, there is no inheritance of surnames from generation to generation, nor is a shared name adopted after marriage.

Due to contact with other cultures and interaction with modern state governments, it has become necessary for many Sherpas to claim a last name. This need arises, for example, when applying for passports and other travel documents, during a census, or when filling out school registration forms. Sherpas often use "Sherpa" as their last name; less commonly, they use the name of their clan.

One of the reasons cited for the choice of "Sherpa" as a surname is the censuses which have been conducted in Nepal since 1911 and which, with the 1961 census, met internationally recognized scientific standards for the first time. Since Sherpas did not have surnames, government officials conducting the censuses are said to have recorded "Sherpa" as the surname for anyone who could not provide a surname and looked and was dressed like a Sherpa.

Another reason is that the term "Sherpa" became synonymous with mountain porters. Anyone wishing to work in this industry could expect to gain significant advantages by including "Sherpa" as part of their name. For this reason, even some non-Sherpas who live in the Sherpa settlement area use "Sherpa" as their last name.

As a result, many Sherpas today use "Sherpa" as their last name. Since the surname cannot be used for distinction, many Sherpas have identical names. In such cases, they distinguish one another based on kinship, clan affiliation, or origin. When outsiders encounter people with the same name, they often use a place name, such as the person's place of residence or birth, to distinguish between them.
