= Tashi Zangmo =

Bhutanese feminist

- Born: c. 1963 (age 62–63); Wamrong, Trashigang district, Bhutan
- Education: Central Institute of Higher Tibetan Studies; Mount Holyoke College; University of Massachusetts
- Awards: Mary Lyon Award

Tashi Zangmo (born c. 1963) is a Bhutanese activist who has been an Executive director for the Bhutan Nuns Foundation (BNF), since 2009.

== Early life and career ==
Zangmo was born on 1963 in Wamrong, Bhutan. She was the first girl from her village and house to go to school. After completing her studies she worked as a secretary in the civil service in 1980s.

She earned academic degrees from India and United States. She received her Buddhology degree from Central Institute of Higher Tibetan Studies (CIHTS), Varanasi and BA degree in Development studies from Mount Holyoke College, Massachusetts. Later she received her master's degree and PhD from University of Massachusetts, Amherst. After studies, she came back Bhutan and became an Executive director for the Bhutan Nuns Foundation. BNF was founded in 2009 under the patronage of Tshering Yangdon.

In 2018 she was listed as one of BBC's 100 Women.
