= Zongo =

Zongo may refer to:

== Places ==
- Zongo, Sud-Ubangi (DR Congo), a town in Democratic Republic of the Congo
- Zongo, Kongo Central DRC, a town in Kongo Central, Democratic Republic of the Congo; see Congo River
- Zongo (crater), an impact crater in the Argyre quadrangle of Mars

== People ==
- Zongo (surname)

== Other ==
- Zongo, a character in the comic series Dungeon
- Zongo Comics, a comic book publishing company founded by Matt Groening
- Zongo Junction, an American instrumental Afrobeat band
- Zongo River, a river in the La Paz Department of Bolivia
- Zongo settlements, areas in West African towns populated mostly by settlers from Northern Sahel areas

== See also ==
- Zango (disambiguation)
