= Zongo (surname) =

Zongo is a surname, and people with the surname include:

- Amy Zongo (born 1980), French athlete
- Anatole Zongo Kuyo (born 1963), Ivorian athlete
- Boureima Zongo (born 1972), Burkinabé football player
- Ernest Zongo (1964–2024), Burkinabé cyclist
- Henri Zongo (died 1989), Burkinabé politician and military officer
- Issa Zongo (born 1980), Burkinabé football player
- Jonathan Zongo (born 1989), Burkinabé football player
- Mamadou Zongo (born 1980), Burkinabé football player
- Masibusane Zongo (born 1990), South African football player
- Moïse Zongo (born 1996), Burkinabé football player
- Norbert Zongo (1949–1998), Burkinabé journalist
- Ousmane Zongo (died 2003), Burkinabé art trader
- Ousseni Zongo (born 1984), Burkinabé football player
- Tertius Zongo (born 1957), Burkinabé politician and diplomat

== See also ==
- Zongo
