= Yeshe =

Yeshe (Tibetan: ཡེ་ཤེས་, Wylie: ye-shes, ZYPY: Yêxê) is a Tibetan term meaning wisdom and is analogous to jnana in Sanskrit. The word appears for example in the title of the Lamrim Yeshe Nyingpo, a Vajrayana Buddhist sacred scripture that records oral teachings of Padmasambhava in the 9th century, and in the name of Yeshe Walmo, a deity of the Tibetan religion of Bon. It is used as a unisex given name by Tibetans and Bhutanese people, also spelled Yeshey, Yeshay, or Yeshi.

People with this name include:

== Religious figures ==
- Yeshe De (Jnanasutra, fl. 5th–6th centuries), a Tibetan Vajrayana Dzogchenpa who was a disciple of Sri Singha
- Yeshe Tsogyal (757–817), a semi-mythical female deity or figure of enlightenment (dakini) in Tibetan Buddhism
- Nubchen Sangye Yeshe (9th century), one of the twenty-five principal students of Guru Padmasambhava
- Yeshe-Ö (c. 959–1040), the first notable lama-king in Tibet
- Yeshe Rinchen (1248–1294), Imperial Preceptor (Dishi) of the Yuan dynasty
- Lobsang Yeshe, 5th Panchen Lama (1663–1737)
- Yeshe Dorje (1676–1702), the eleventh Gyalwa Karmapa, head of the Kagyu School of Tibetan Buddhism
- Lobsang Palden Yeshe, 6th Panchen Lama (1738–1780), of Tashilhunpo Monastery in Tibet
- Thubten Yeshe (1935–1984), Tibetan lama who, while exiled in Nepal, co-founded Kopan Monastery
- Yeshe Losal Rinpoche (born 1943), lama in the Kagyu school of Tibetan Buddhism, abbott of the Samye Ling Monastery, Scotland

== Politicians ==
- Sanggyai Yexe (1917–2008), Chinese Communist Party official
- Yeshey Zimba (born 1952), Bhutanese politician, former Prime Minister
- Yeshey Penjor (born c. 1964), Bhutanese politician
- Yeshey Dem (fl. 2018), Bhutanese politician

== Sportspeople ==
- Yeshey Gyeltshen (born 1983), Bhutanese footballer
- Yeshey Dorji (born 1989), Bhutanese footballer

== Other ==
- Yeshi Dhonden (1927–2019), practitioner of Tibetan traditional medicine
- Yeshe Dorjee Thongchi (born 1952), Indian writer from Arunachal Pradesh
- Yeshe Choesang (born 1974), India-based journalist, author, Human Rights advocate, social worker
