= Diki (disambiguation) =

Diki is a village in the Bamingui-Bangoran Prefecture in the northern Central African Republic.

Diki may also refer to:

- Diki-Diki (cocktail), a cocktail made with calvados, Swedish Punsch, and grapefruit juice

== People with the name ==
- Diki Tsering (c. 1901 – 1981), mother of three reincarnated Rinpoches/Lamas
- Pema Diki Sherpa (born 1988), Nepalese mountain climber

== See also ==
- Tibetan name
