= Visa requirements for Jordanian citizens =

Visa required for Jordanian nationality

Visa requirements for Jordanian citizens are administrative entry restrictions by the authorities of other states placed on citizens of Jordan.

As of 2026, according to Henley Passport Index, Jordanian citizens have visa-free or visa-on-arrival access to 49 countries and territories, ranking the Jordanian passport 83rd in terms of travel freedom.

== Visa requirements map ==
Visa restrictions applicable to holders of a Jordanian ordinary passport Jordan Visa not required eVisa Visa on arrival Visa required

== Visa requirements ==
| Country | Visa requirement | Allowed stay | Notes (excluding departure fees) |
|---|---|---|---|
| Afghanistan | eVisa | 30 days | Visitors born in Afghanistan, born to Afghan parents or with parents born in Afghanistan are exempt from any visa requirements; a copy of the parent's passport is required.; Visitors arriving via military air need to legalize their stay if they wish to leave via commercial airline.; Visas on arrival are available at Hamid Karzai International Airport to United Nations employees, Interpol employees, business visitors, journalists, athletes, airline staff and passengers in transit from countries that do not have a diplomatic mission of Afghanistan.; All visitors are fingerprinted. |
| Albania | eVisa | | Any visitor who holds a valid, multiple entry and previously used visa issued by a (European Union) Schengen Area country, United States, or the United Kingdom can enter Albania without a visa for 90 days. Visa must have been used at least once before arrival to Albania. The visa exemption also applies to valid Green Card holders and holders of resident permits issued by a Schengen country for a maximum allowed stay of 90 days.; Visitors of Albanian ethnicity do not require a visa to enter Albania for a maximum allowed stay of 90 days within 180 days. |
| Algeria | Visa required | | Visas are not required for visitors with a re-entry permit or a residence permit (or Carte Personelle) issued by Algeria.; Persons may be denied entry if entering with a passport containing visas or stamps issued by Israel. |
| Andorra | Visa required | | Although no visa requirements exist, apply the relevant regulations of France or Spain, whichever must be transited to reach Andorra. |
| Angola | Visa required | | An International Certificate of Vaccination is required.; The personnel of oil companies established in Angola may obtain a visa on arrival, provided they are holding the necessary documents which includes a visa on arrival application that must be submitted by the oil company at least 2 weeks prior to arrival. |
| Antigua and Barbuda | eVisa | | Permanent residents of the United States and Canada and holders of valid visas issued by the United States, Canada, (European Union) Schengen Area and the United Kingdom do not require a visa for an allowed stay of up to 30 days. A visa waiver fee of US$100 (~71 JOD) is payable upon arrival.; Visitors must have a printed e-visa confirmation.; Antigua and Barbuda apply a stringent application of rules regarding proof of sufficient funds, a return ticket and accommodation.; Antigua & Barbuda has a 70 XCD (~18 JOD) airport Departure tax.; Cruise ship visitors who would normally require a visa do not require one provided that they arrive in Antigua and Barbuda in the morning and depart the same evening. |
| Argentina | Visa required | | All visitors are fingerprinted and photographed upon entry. |
| Armenia | eVisa / Visa on arrival | 120 days | Holders of confirmed onward tickets may stay in transit without a visa for a maximum time of 72 hours (3 days).; A visa on arrival costs 15,000 AMD (~22 JOD).; Visitors may apply for an e-visa which allows applicants an allowed stay of up to 120 days with a US$31 (~22 JOD) fee or 21 days with a US$6 (4.25 JOD) fee.; Visas are granted on arrival at the following entry points: Zvartnots International Airport (Yerevan), Shirak Airport (Gyumri), Ayrum railway station, Bagratashen, Gogavan (borders with Georgia), Meghri (border with Iran). |
| Australia | Online Visa required | | Holders of confirmed onward tickets may stay in transit at Gold Coast Airport or any other international airport in Australia without a visa for a maximum time of 2 hours as long as they are arriving and departing on the same aircraft (excluding Gold Coast Airport). Holders of confirmed onward tickets may also stay in transit without a visa at any international airport in Australia (except for Gold Coast Airport) for a maximum time of 8 hours. |
| Austria | Visa required | | Passengers entering Austria on a one-way ticket without sufficient funds to purchase a return/onward ticket could be refused entry.; Valid visas in travel documents that are full and invalidated are accepted when accompanied by a new travel document.; Visitors with a family member residence card issued by Bulgaria, Croatia, Cyprus, Ireland, Romania or the United Kingdom to family members of a national of Switzerland or an (European Union) EEA Member State are visa exempt for a maximum allowed stay of 90 days within a 180-day period. This does not apply to visitors with a different type of residence permit.; Visitors with a residence permit issued by Monaco or a (European Union) Schengen Member State are visa exempt for a maximum allowed stay of 90 days within a 180-day period (residence permits issued by Malta must be biometric).; Visitors' means of subsistence during their stay are assessed on a case-by-case basis and may be refused entry if inadequate. |
| Azerbaijan | eVisa | 30 days | Holders of confirmed onward tickets may stay in transit without a visa for a maximum time of 72 hours (3 days).; If intending to stay in the Republic of Azerbaijan for more than ten days, the visitor must register at the State Migration Service of the Republic of Azerbaijan within three days upon arrival in Azerbaijan.; Holders of diplomatic passports or official/service passports do not require a visa to visit Azerbaijan for up to 90 days.; Due to a state of war with Armenia, the Government of Azerbaijan bans the entry of citizens from Armenia, as well as citizens of any other country who are of Armenian descent, to the Republic of Azerbaijan (though there have been exceptions, notably for Armenia's participation at the 2015 European Games held in Azerbaijan).; The government of Azerbaijan strictly bans any visit of foreign citizens to the separatist region of Nagorno-Karabakh (the de facto Nagorno-Karabakh Republic), its surrounding territories and the Azerbaijani exclaves of Karki, Yuxarı Əskipara, Barxudarlı and Sofulu which are de jure part of Azerbaijan but under control of Armenia, without prior consent of the Government of Azerbaijan. Foreign citizens who enter these occupied territories, will be permanently banned from entering the Republic of Azerbaijan and will be included into the "list of persona non grata".; ASAN Electronic Visa applications are also available directly at the ports of entry at any land border. The e-visa should be printed and presented together with the passport (that should be valid at least 3 months more than the validity period of the electronic visa) at the border checkpoint.; Holders of an official invitation letter issued by the State Migration Service of Azerbaijan or any other Azerbaijani government authority can be granted a visa on arrival. |
| Bahamas | eVisa | | Holders of confirmed onward tickets may stay in transit without a visa for a maximum time of 72 hours (3 days).; A visa is not required for visitors with a permanent resident card issued by Canada or a Permanent Resident/Resident Alien Card (Form I-551) issued by the United States for a maximum allowed stay of 30 days.; Cruise ship passengers travelling to and returning from the Bahamas are required to obtain a visa for entry. Both entry and departure must be by a cruise ship. |
| Bahrain | eVisa / Visa on arrival | 14 days | Holders of diplomatic passports or official/service passports can obtain a visa on arrival.; Holders of a pre-arranged Stopover Paid by Carrier (STPC) issued to those in transit for a minimum of 8 hours and a maximum of 24 hours are permitted to leave the Airport and proceed to their hotel, if holding passports valid for at least 3 months and subject to immigration approval.; Passengers with a visa issued by Saudi Arabia and permitted entry by land can obtain a 24-hour transit visa on arrival if continuing their journey by land using the King Fahd Causeway.; Visitors may also apply for a multiple entry visa valid for one year for an allowed stay of 90 days or a multiple entry visa valid for three months for an allowed stay of one month.; Residents of Gulf Cooperation Council countries who have already stayed for more than six months in their country of residence and their professions are in an approved list are eligible for either a 72-hour or a 7-day visa upon their arrival at the airport.; e-Visa applicants must supply scanned copies of their air tickets, passports and hotel bookings and are valid for 30 days from the date of approval. |
| Bangladesh | Visa required | | Crew members traveling for non-duty purposes can obtain a visa on arrival (Fee: ~US$50/~35 JOD) if holding Crew Member Identification Cards. Otherwise, the same regulations as for passengers apply.; Passengers with a diplomatic passport and a return/onward ticket can obtain a visa on arrival for a maximum allowed stay of 30 days. They can apply to extend their stay.; Passengers with a return/onward ticket and a confirmation letter issued by the Bangladesh Board of Investment (BOI) traveling on business can obtain a visa on arrival. The letter must contain a BOI registration number and the accredited inviting organization must notify the Immigration authorities prior to arrival.; Passengers with an onward ticket can obtain a transit visa on arrival for a maximum allowed stay of 72 hours (3 days).; Passengers with a return/onward ticket and proof of being of Bangladeshi origin can, along with their spouses and children obtain a visa on arrival for a maximum allowed stay of 30 days which can be extended if need be.; Bangladeshi diplomatic missions provide a No Visa Required (NVR) seal for Bangladeshis holding a foreign passport/nationality, No Visa Required (NVR) seals are provided to non-Bangladeshis who are descendants or spouses of Bangladeshis as well. This seal allows the passenger to travel to Bangladesh on multiple occasions without restrictions on duration within the validity of the visa. The No Visa Required (NVR) facility is valid until the validity of the passport ends and can be transferred to the new passport of the same person as required. |
| Barbados | Visa not required | 90 days | |
| Belarus | Visa required | | All visitors are required to have adequate health insurance which can be purchased on arrival at Minsk National Airport.; The Foreign Admissions Division at Minsk National Airport of the Consular Directorate of the Ministry of Foreign Affairs issues visas on arrival if the support documents were submitted no later than 3 business days before the expected date of arrival.; Registration upon arrival for stays longer than 5 days is mandatory.; No transit without a visa under any circumstance. |
| Belgium | Visa required | | Valid visas in travel documents that are full and invalidated are accepted when accompanied by a new travel document.; Visitors with a family member residence card issued by Bulgaria, Croatia, Cyprus, Ireland, Romania or the United Kingdom to family members of a national of Switzerland or an (European Union) EEA Member State are visa exempt for a maximum allowed stay of 90 days. This does not apply to visitors with a different type of residence permit.; Visitors without the following means of subsistence during their stay may be refused entry: 45 EUR (~37 JOD) per day for aliens staying with a private individual; €95 (~78 JOD) per day for aliens staying at a hotel. |
| Belize | Visa required | | A visa is not required for visitors with a valid visa issued by a (European Union) Schengen Area Member State for a maximum allowed stay of 90 days.; Visitors with a US Permanent Resident/Resident Alien Card (Form I-551) or a multiple-entry visa issued by the United States can obtain a visa on arrival for a fee of US$50 (~35 JOD).; All visitors are required to have sufficient funds, US$75 per day, and the documents required for their next destination. |
| Benin | eVisa | 30 days | Must have an international vaccination certificate. |
| Bhutan | eVisa | | All foreigners must obtain a visa before visiting Bhutan. Foreign tourists must use a licensed Bhutanese tour operator or one of their international partners to pre-arrange their visa and book their holiday.; A daily fee is charged for every day of stay.; Upon entering Bhutan, all foreigners are issued a 7 or 14 days "Entry Permit" by default, valid for Thimphu and Paro only. The rest of Bhutan is considered a restricted area, and foreigners need a "Restricted-Area Permit" to enter.; Foreigners wishing to visit Buddhist temples must obtain a "Temple Permit" from the Ministry of Culture. |
| Bolivia | eVisa / Visa on arrival | 90 days | 90 days within one year.; Extension of stay is possible.; Holders of diplomatic and official/service passports do not require a visa for up to 90 days.; Visitors may obtain a visa on arrival only when holding a hotel confirmation or an invitation letter issued by the Bolivian Immigration Authorities, as well as an outbound ticket.; Alternatively, the visa may be obtained at any Bolivian embassy or consulate free of charge. |
| Bosnia and Herzegovina | Visa required | | Holders of diplomatic or official/service passports do not require a visa for a maximum allowed stay of 90 days.; Registration with the local police within 24 hours of arrival in Bosnia and Herzegovina is mandatory.; Valid multiple entry visa holders and residents of the (European Union) Schengen Area member states and Monaco can enter Bosnia and Herzegovina without a visa for a maximum allowed stay of 15 days. They must arrive from one of the Schengen Area member states, Monaco or a third country that has a bilateral readmission agreement with Bosnia and Herzegovina. |
| Botswana | eVisa | 3 months | Visitors wishing to stay in Botswana for more than 90 days should apply for an extension prior to arrival. |
| Brazil | Visa required | | A valid visa in an expired passport is accepted if: the page containing the valid visa has not been invalidated or mutilated and the visa is clearly legible.; the passenger holds a valid passport of the same nationality.; a handwritten annotation does not appear in the passport.; Holders of diplomatic or official/service passports do not require a visa to visit Brazil for up to 30 days.; Visas issued to Tourist Visa applicants are valid for first entry within 90 days, and the validity of the visa begins on the day of the first entry to Brazil.; All foreigners staying in Brazil for more than 90 days must register with the Federal Police in Brazil and obtain an identity card. |
| Brunei | Visa required | | Immigration offences, such as overstay of visa, have been punishable by caning since June 12, 2004. This punishment, often combined with a jail sentence, concerns business travelers to Brunei who overstay their work visas, as well as their work associates, and others who don't abide by immigration laws.; Passengers transiting through Brunei International Airport for less than 24 hours (1 day) do not require a visa. Those traveling to a third country can obtain a transit visa on arrival for a maximum allowed stay of 72 hours (3 days). |
| Bulgaria | Visa required | | Holders of short stay and transit visas issued by Croatia, Cyprus and Romania can enter Bulgaria for the duration of their visa.; National visas issued by Bulgaria or Schengen visas issued by a (European Union) Schengen Member State in expired, full or invalidated travel documents are accepted if accompanied by a new valid travel document of the same nationality.; Visitors with a family member residence card issued by Switzerland or another (European Union) EEA Member State are visa exempt and allowed a total stay of 90 days within a period of 180 days. The card must be issued to family members of a national of Switzerland or an EEA Member State. They must travel with or travel to join the national of Switzerland or an EEA Member State. This does not apply to visitors with a different type of residence permit.; Visitors with a residence permit issued by Croatia, Cyprus, Romania or a Schengen Member State are visa exempt for a maximum allowed stay of 90 days within a 180-day period (residence permits issued by Malta must be biometric).; Holders of a (European Union) Schengen visa can enter Bulgaria for up to 90 days within a 180-day period during the validity of their Schengen visa (must hold a double or multiple entry C or D visa) without having to apply for a Bulgarian visa. |
| Burkina Faso | eVisa | | Passengers holding confirmed onward tickets may transit through airports of Burkina Faso for up to 24 hours (1 day) without a transit visa. A transit visa can be obtained on arrival for a maximum allowed stay of 72 hours (3 days).; Visa on arrival is available to holders of consular, diplomatic, special or official/service passports free of charge.; An International Certificate of Vaccination is required. |
| Burundi | Visa on arrival | 1 month | Passengers with an Entry Authorization letter issued by the authorities of Burundi before departure are eligible for a visa on arrival at Bujumbura International Airport for a maximum allowed stay of 1 month. They can apply to extend their stay.; All visitors are fingerprinted on arrival in Burundi. |
| Cambodia | eVisa / Visa on arrival | 30 days | |
| Cameroon | eVisa | | |
| Canada | Visa required | | |
| Cape Verde | Visa on arrival | | |
| Central African Republic | Visa required | | |
| Chad | eVisa | | |
| Chile | Visa required | | |
| China | Visa required | | Jordanians can transit without a visa if they have an onward ticket for a flight within 24 hours.; Jordanians can obtain a visa upon arrival at Shenzhen (SZX) for a maximum of 5 days if they travel as tourists. |
| Colombia | Online Visa | | |
| Comoros | Visa on arrival | 45 Days | |
| Republic of the Congo | Visa required | | |
| Democratic Republic of the Congo | eVisa | 90 days | |
| Costa Rica | Visa required | | Visa is not required if the traveler has a permanent residence (Greencard holder), a student visa (F1, J1, etc.), a work visa (H1B, G4, L1, EB-1, etc.) in the UNITED STATES OF AMERICA, CANADA, SWITZERLAND, ENGLAND, WALES, SCOTLAND, NORTHERN IRELAND, NORWAY, ICELAND and countries members of the EUROPEAN UNION |
| Côte d'Ivoire | eVisa | 3 months | e-Visa holders must arrive via Port Bouet Airport. |
| Croatia | Visa required | | |
| Cuba | eVisa | 90 days | Can be extended up to 90 days with a fee.; Tourist card must be obtained in advance via travel agency, airline or at the embassy. |
| Cyprus | Visa required | | |
| Czech Republic | Visa required | | |
| Denmark | Visa required | | |
| Djibouti | eVisa / Visa on arrival | 90 days | |
| Dominica | Visa not required | 21 days | |
| Dominican Republic | Visa required | | |
| Ecuador | Visa not required | 90 days | |
| Egypt | Visa not required | 3 months | Visitors must be holding a normal 5-year passport, provided passport does not contain a stamp from the Jordanian Registration Office on the reverse side cover of the passport. |
| El Salvador | eVisa | | |
| Equatorial Guinea | eVisa | | |
| Eritrea | Visa required | | |
| Estonia | Visa required | | |
| Eswatini | Visa required | | |
| Ethiopia | eVisa / Visa on arrival | 90 days | e-Visa holders must arrive via Addis Ababa Bole International Airport. |
| Fiji | Visa required | | |
| Finland | Visa required | | |
| France | Visa required | | Visa exemption agreement has been signed for Jordanian Diplomatic passports. |
| Gabon | eVisa | 90 days | e-Visa holders must arrive via Libreville International Airport. |
| Gambia | Visa required | | |
| Georgia | Visa not required | 1 year | |
| Germany | Visa required | | |
| Ghana | Visa required | | |
| Greece | Visa required | | |
| Grenada | Visa required | | |
| Guatemala | Visa required | | Visa is not required up to 90 days if holding a valid residence permit issued by Australia, Canada, GCC member state the United States the United Kingdom or a Schengen Area Member State. |
| Guinea | eVisa | 90 days | |
| Guinea-Bissau | Visa on arrival | 90 days | |
| Guyana | Visa required | | |
| Haiti | Visa not required | 3 months | |
| Honduras | Visa required | | Visa is not required if holding a valid visa for at least 6 months at the time of arrival, issued by Canada, the United States or a Schengen Area Member State. |
| Hungary | Visa required | | |
| Iceland | Visa required | | |
| India | eVisa | 60 days | e-Visa holders must arrive via 32 designated airports (Note: Ahmedabad; Amritsar; Bagdogra; Bengaluru; Bhubaneswar; Chandigarh; Chennai; Coimbatore; Delhi; Gaya; Goa-Dabolim; Goa-Manohar; Guwahati; Hyderabad; Indore; Jaipur; Kannur; Kochi; Kolkata; Kozhikode; Lucknow; Madurai; Mangaluru; Mumbai; Nagpur; Port Blair; Pune; Surat; Thiruvananthapuram; Tiruchirappalli; Varanasi; Visakhapatnam) or 5 designated seaports. (Note: Chennai; Cochin; Mormugao; Mumbai; Mangalore); An Indian e-Tourist Visa may only be obtained twice within 1 calendar year.; Foreigners of Pakistani origin or who hold a Pakistani Passport are not eligible for an e-Visa. Foreigners who are not Pakistani nationals, but whose parents or grandparents (either paternal or maternal) were born in, or were permanent residents in Pakistan, are also not eligible for an e-Visa. |
| Indonesia | e-Visa / Visa on arrival | 30 days | |
| Iran | Visa required | | |
| Iraq | Visa on arrival . | Jordanian citizens can apply visa on arrival. | |
| Ireland | Visa required | | |
| Israel | eVisa | | https://israel-entry.piba.gov.il/learn-about-evisa-b2/ |
| Italy | Visa required | | |
| Jamaica | Visa required | | |
| Japan | Visa required | | Holders of Jordanian passports who reside in the following 11 countries (Brazil, Cambodia, Canada, Mongolia, Saudi Arabia, Singapore, South Africa, Taiwan, United Arab Emirates, United Kingdom, and the United States) can apply and obtain an electronic visa (e-Visa). The duration of stay for these countries is up to 90 days. |
| Kazakhstan | Visa required | | |
| Kenya | Electronic Travel Authorisation | 90 days | Applications can be submitted up to 90 days prior to travel and must be submitted at least 3 days in advance.; eTA fee is 32.50 USD.; Proof of reservation at the hotel where visitors plan to stay is required (if staying with friends, an invitation letter is also acceptable).; Yellow fever vaccination certificate is required if coming from endemic countries. |
| Kiribati | Visa required | | |
| North Korea | Visa required | | |
| Kuwait | Visa required | | visa not required for diplomatic passport 30 days.; e-Visa can be obtained for holders of a Residence Permit issued by a GCC member state under the following conditions: To be 18 years old and over.; The residence permit for a GCC state must be valid for at least another 3 months.; To be accompanied by the sponsor of the residence permit if the sponsor is an individual.; Does not apply to holders of a GCC Student Visa and Non-Skilled Worker Visa |
| Kyrgyzstan | eVisa | 60 days | e-Visa holders must arrive via Manas International Airport or Osh Airport or through land crossings with China (at Irkeshtam and Torugart), Kazakhstan (at Ak-jol, Ak-Tilek, Chaldybar, Chon-Kapka), Tajikistan (at Bor-Dobo, Kulundu, Kyzyl-Bel) and Uzbekistan (at Dostuk). |
| Laos | Visa required | | |
| Latvia | Visa required | | |
| Lebanon | Visa not required | 6 months | ID card valid. |
| Lesotho | eVisa | 14 Days | |
| Liberia | Visa required | | |
| Libya | eVisa / Visa on arrival | | Visa on arrival is available at Mitiga International Airport. |
| Liechtenstein | Visa required | | |
| Lithuania | Visa required | | |
| Luxembourg | Visa required | | |
| Madagascar | eVisa / Visa on arrival | 90 days | |
| Malawi | eVisa / Visa on arrival | 30 days | |
| Malaysia | Visa not required | 90 days | |
| Maldives | Free visa on arrival | 30 days | |
| Mali | Visa required | | |
| Malta | Visa required | | |
| Marshall Islands | Visa required | | |
| Mauritania | eVisa | 90 Days | Available at Nouakchott–Oumtounsy International Airport. |
| Mauritius | Visa on arrival | 60 days | |
| Mexico | Visa required | | Visa is not required for Holders of a valid visa of Canada, US, UK or a Schengen State and Permanent residence of Canada, Chile, Colombia, Schengen State, Japan, UK, US; Entry may be refused by immigration officials for individuals who were previously denied a US visa, even if holding a valid Mexican visa. |
| Micronesia | Visa not required | 30 days | |
| Moldova | eVisa | | Citizens holding a residence permit or a valid visa issued by one of the member states of the European Union or one of the parties to the Schengen Agreement can apply for an electronic visa. |
| Monaco | Visa required | | |
| Mongolia | Visa required | | |
| Montenegro | Visa required | | Visa not required for holders of a valid Australia, Japan, Canada, New Zealand, Ireland, US, UK or a Schengen Visa.; Holders of residence permit in the United Arab Emirates may enter, in Montenegro for a duration of 10 days |
| Morocco | eVisa | 30 days | |
| Mozambique | eVisa / Visa on arrival | 30 days | |
| Myanmar | eVisa | 28 days | e-Visa holders must arrive via Yangon, Nay Pyi Taw or Mandalay airports or via land border crossings with Thailand — Tachileik, Myawaddy and Kawthaung or India — Rih Khaw Dar and Tamu.; e-Visa is available for tourism only. |
| Namibia | Visa required | | |
| Nauru | Visa required | | |
| Nepal | Online Visa / Visa on arrival | 150 days | |
| Netherlands | Visa required | | |
| New Zealand | Visa required | | Holders of an Australian Permanent Resident Visa or Resident Return Visa may be granted a New Zealand Resident Visa on arrival permitting indefinite stay (pursuant to the Trans-Tasman Travel Arrangement), subject to meeting character requirements and obtaining an Electronic Travel Authority prior to departure. |
| Nicaragua | Visa on arrival | 30 days | |
| Niger | Visa required | | |
| Nigeria | eVisa | 90 days | |
| North Macedonia | Visa required | | Visa is not required for stays upto 15 days if holding a valid multiple entry visa of Canada, the United States, United Kingdom, Schengen Area member state, or residence permit of Schengen Area member state. |
| Norway | Visa required | | |
| Oman | Visa not required | 14 days | Visa exempted only if holding a valid residency in a GCC country or a Schengen or United States visa. |
| Pakistan | eVisa | 90 days | Issued free of charge as of August 2024. |
| Palau | Free visa on arrival | 30 days | |
| Panama | Visa required | | |
| Papua New Guinea | eVisa | 60 days | Visitors may apply for a visa online under the "Tourist - Own Itinerary" category. |
| Paraguay | Visa required | | |
| Peru | Visa required | | |
| Philippines | eVisa | 59 days | Available in single entry (valid for 3 months) or multiple entry (valid for 6 months or 1 year). |
| Poland | Visa required | | |
| Portugal | Visa required | | |
| Qatar | eVisa | | Travelers can apply for a visa on the Hayya website. |
| Romania | Visa required | | |
| Russia | Visa not required | 30 days | For a maximum total stay of 90 days within one calendar year period |
| Rwanda | Visa not required | 90 days | |
| Saint Kitts and Nevis | Electronic Travel Authorisation | 3 months | |
| Saint Lucia | Visa required | | |
| Saint Vincent and the Grenadines | Visa not required | 3 months | |
| Samoa | Visa not required | 60 days | |
| San Marino | Visa required | | |
| São Tomé and Príncipe | eVisa | | |
| Saudi Arabia | Visa required | | |
| Senegal | Visa required | | |
| Serbia | Visa required | | |
| Seychelles | Electronic Border System | 3 months | Application can be submitted up to 30 days before travel.; Visitors must upload a reservation confirmation(s) for each visitor's location of stay in Seychelles.; Yellow fever vaccination certificate is required if coming from endemic countries.; Payment of the fee (EUR 10) by credit or debit card.; Valid for one journey only and it expires once exit the country. |
| Sierra Leone | eVisa | 3 months | |
| Singapore | evisa | | |
| Slovakia | Visa required | | Visa exemption agreement has been signed for Jordanian Diplomatic passports. |
| Slovenia | Visa required | | |
| Solomon Islands | Visa required | | Visa on arrival if having pre-arranged visa. |
| Somalia | eVisa | 30 days | All visitors must have an approved Electronic Visa (eTAS) before the start of their journey. |
| South Africa | Visa not required | 30 days | |
| South Korea | Visa required | | visa not required for diplomatic Passport 90 days |
| South Sudan | eVisa | | Obtainable online.; Printed visa authorization must be presented at the time of travel. |
| Spain | Visa required | | |
| Sri Lanka | ETA / Visa on arrival | 60 days / 30 days | Sri Lanka introduced an ETA valid for 30 days. |
| Sudan | Visa required | | |
| Suriname | Visa not required | 90 days | An entrance fee of USD 50 or EUR 50 must be paid online prior to arrival.; Multiple entry e-Visa is also available. |
| Sweden | Visa required | | |
| Switzerland | Visa required | | |
| Syria | Visa not required | | Departure tax applies. |
| Tajikistan | Visa not required | 30 days | |
| Tanzania | eVisa / Visa on arrival | 90 days | |
| Thailand | Visa not required | 30 days | |
| Timor-Leste | Visa on arrival | 30 days | |
| Togo | eVisa | 15 days | |
| Tonga | Visa required | | |
| Trinidad and Tobago | eVisa | | |
| Tunisia | Visa not required | 90 days | |
| Turkey | Visa not required | 90 days | |
| Turkmenistan | Visa required | | |
| Tuvalu | Visa on arrival | 1 month | |
| Uganda | eVisa | 3 months | |
| Ukraine | Visa required | | |
| United Arab Emirates | evisa | | May apply using 'Smart service'.; visa not required for diplomatic Passport 90 days |
| United Kingdom | Visa required | | |
| United States | Visa required | | |
| Uruguay | Visa required | | |
| Uzbekistan | Visa not required | 30 days | |
| Vanuatu | Visa required | | |
| Vatican City | Visa required | | |
| Venezuela | eVisa | | Introduction of Electronic Visa System for Tourist and Business Travelers. |
| Vietnam | eVisa | | e-Visa is valid for 90 days and multiple entry. |
| Yemen | Visa on arrival | 90 days | |
| Zambia | eVisa | 90 days | |
| Zimbabwe | eVisa | 3 months | |

=== Dependent, disputed, or restricted territories ===
Visa requirements for Jordanian citizens for visits to various territories, disputed areas, partially recognized countries not mentioned in the list above, and restricted zones:

| Territory | Visa requirement | Allowed stay | Notes (excluding departure fees unless otherwise noted) |
Africa
| Ascension Island | eVisa | 3 months | 3 months within any year period. |
| (Sudan) Darfur | Travel permit required | | Separate travel permit is required. |
| Eritrea outside Asmara | Travel permit required | | To travel in the rest of the country, a Travel Permit for Foreigners is required (20 Eritrean nakfa). |
| (France) Mayotte | Visa required | | |
| (France) Réunion | Visa required | 90 days per 6-month period for up to 15 days at a time | |
| Sahrawi Arab Democratic Republic | Visa required | | Undefined visa regime in the Western Sahara controlled territory. |
| Saint Helena | eVisa | | |
| Somaliland | Visa required | 30 days | |
| Sudan outside Khartoum | Travel permit required | | All foreigners traveling more than 25 kilometers outside of Khartoum must obtain a travel permit. |
| Tristan da Cunha | Permission required | | Permission to land required for 15/30 pounds sterling (yacht/ship passenger) for Tristan da Cunha Island or 20 pounds sterling for Gough Island, Inaccessible Island or Nightingale Islands. |
Asia
| Baikonur & Priozersk | Special permission required | | Special permission required for the city of Baikonur and surrounding areas in Kyzylorda Oblast, and the town of Priozersk near Almaty. |
| Bhutan outside Thimphu or Paro | Restricted-Area Permit required | | All of Bhutan outside of the Paro and Thimphu valleys is classified as a restricted area. Tour operators obtain a 'road permit' for the places on your itinerary, and this permit is checked and endorsed by the police at immigration checkpoints strategically located at important road junctions. The tour operator must return the permit to the government at the completion of the tour, and it is scrutinized for major deviations from the authorized program.; There are immigration checkpoints in Hongtsho (east of Thimphu), Chhukha (between Thimphu and Phuentsholing), Rinchending (above Phuentsholing), Wangdue Phodrang, Chazam (near Trashigang), Wamrong (between Trashigang and Samdrup Jongkhar) and in Samdrup Jongkhar. All are open from 5am to 9pm daily.; Foreigners wishing to visit Buddhist temples must obtain a "Temple Permit" from the Ministry of Culture.; May apply online. |
| British Indian Ocean Territory | Special permit required | | Special permit required. |
| (Tajikistan) Gorno-Badakhshan Autonomous Province | OIVR permit required | | OIVR permit required (15+5 Tajikistani Somoni) and another special permit (free of charge) is required for Lake Sarez. |
| (China) Hainan | Visa required | | |
| Hong Kong | Visa not required | 30 days | |
| India PAP/RAP | PAP/RAP required | | A Protected Area Permit (PAP) is required for the whole of the state of Sikkim and parts of the states of Arunachal Pradesh, Himachal Pradesh, Jammu and Kashmir, Manipur, Mizoram, Nagaland Rajasthan and Uttaranchal.; A Restricted Area Permit (RAP) is required for the whole of the Union Territory of the Andaman and Nicobar Islands and parts of the state of Sikkim.; Some of these requirements are occasionally lifted for a year. |
| Iraqi Kurdistan | Visa required | | Passport holders with the country of birth being Iraq are exempt from the 14-day stay restrictions, even if a citizen of another country. |
| Jeju-do | Visa not required | 30 days | |
| (Iran) Kish Island | Visa not required | 14 days | Visitors to Kish Island do not require a visa. |
| (United Nations) Korean Demilitarized Zone | Restricted zone | | Visits to the Korean Demilitarized Zone must be done with a tour operator. |
| Macau | Visa on arrival | 30 days | |
| Maldives outside Malé | Permission required | | Tourists are generally prohibited from visiting non-resort islands without the express permission of the Government of the Maldives. |
| (Saudi Arabia) Mecca and Medina | Special access required | | Non-Muslims and those following the Ahmadiyya religious movement are strictly prohibited from entry. However, many parts of Medina, notably the outskirts and the Medina Airport, are open to all. |
| North Korea outside Pyongyang | Special permit required | | People are not allowed to leave the capital city, tourists can only leave the capital with a governmental tourist guide (no independent moving). |
| (India) North Sentinel Island | Restricted zone | | |
| Palestine | Visa required | | Arrival by sea to the Gaza Strip is not allowed. |
| (Vietnam) Phú Quốc | Visa not required | 30 days | |
| (Iran) Qeshm Island | Visa not required | 14 days | Visitors to Qeshm Island do not require a visa. |
| (Malaysia) Sabah and Sarawak | Visa not required | | These states have their own immigration authorities and passport is required to travel to them, however the same visa applies. |
| Taiwan | Visa required | | |
| (China) Tibet Autonomous Region | TTP required | | Tibet Travel Permit required (10 US Dollars). |
| Closed cities of Turkmenistan | Special permit required | | A special permit, issued prior to arrival by Ministry of Foreign Affairs, is required if visiting the following places: Atamurat, Cheleken, Dashoguz, Serakhs and Serhetabat. |
| (United Nations) UNDOF Zone and Ghajar | Restricted zone | | |
| Yemen outside Sanaa or Aden | Special permission required | | Special permission needed for travel outside Sanaa or Aden. |
Caribbean and North Atlantic
| Anguilla | Visa required | | Holders of a valid visa issued by the United Kingdom and holders of diplomatic passports do not require a visa. |
| Aruba | Visa required | 90 days within any 180 day period | 90 days in Aruba, Caribbean Netherlands, Curaçao and Sint Maarten combined. |
| Bermuda | Visa required | | Visa free for a maximum stay of 3 months if transiting through the United Kingdom. |
| British Virgin Islands | Visa required | | |
| Caribbean Netherlands | Visa required | 90 days within any 180 day period (Caribbean Netherlands refers to Bonaire, Saba and St. Eustatius) | 90 days in Aruba, Caribbean Netherlands, Curaçao and Sint Maarten combined. |
| Cayman Islands | Visa required | | A maximum visa-free stay of 30 days is also granted to permanent residents of the United States when arriving directly from the United States, Canada when arriving directly from Canada or the United States, or the United Kingdom when arriving directly from the United Kingdom. |
| Curacao | Visa required | 90 days within any 180 day period | 90 days in Aruba, Caribbean Netherlands, Curaçao and Sint Maarten combined. |
| (France) French West Indies | Visa required | 3 months (French West Indies refers to Martinique, Guadeloupe, Saint Martin and Saint Barthélemy) | |
| Greenland | Visa required | | |
| (Venezuela) Margarita Island | Visa required | | |
| Montserrat | e-Visa | | |
| Navassa Island | Special permit required | | |
| Puerto Rico | Visa required | | Visa not required if holding a valid multiple-entry visa issued by USA. |
| (France) Saint Pierre and Miquelon | Visa required | | |
| (Colombia) San Andrés and Leticia | Tourist Card on arrival | | Visitors arriving at Gustavo Rojas Pinilla International Airport and Alfredo Vásquez Cobo International Airport must buy tourist cards on arrival. |
| Sint Maarten | Visa required | 90 days within any 180 day period | *90 days in Aruba, Caribbean Netherlands, Curaçao and Sint Maarten combined. |
| Turks and Caicos Islands | Visa required | | |
| (United States Virgin Islands) U.S. Virgin Islands | Visa required | | |
Europe
| Abkhazia | Visa required | | Tourists from all countries (except Georgia) can visit Abkhazia for a period not exceeding 24 hours as part of an organized tourist group. |
| (United Kingdom) Akrotiri and Dhekelia | Visa required | | The visa policy is the same as for Cyprus, which follows the visa policy of the Schengen Area. However, stays longer than 28 days per 12-month period require a permit. The territory has open borders with Cyprus, but maintains border checks with Northern Cyprus. |
| Mount Athos | Special permit required | | Special permit required (4 days: 25 euro for Orthodox visitors, 35 euro for non-Orthodox visitors, 18 euro for students). There is a visitors' quota: maximum 100 Orthodox and 10 non-Orthodox per day and women are not allowed. |
| (Belarus) (Poland) Augustów Canal | Visa not required | 5 days | Visitors to the Augustów Canal holding the relevant document (filled out by a travel agency, the form being different for individual and group visits) are entitled to visit the areas listed as follows upon entry to Belarus via Rudawka–Liasnaja, Kuźnica–Bruzgi, Švendubrė–Pryvalka and Raigardas–Pryvalka border checkpoints: Augustów Canal recreational park; Grodno; part of Grodno District – territory of rural councils of; Hoža; Kapcioŭka; Adeĺsk; Padlabiennie; Sapockin; The visa exemption will remain in force until the end of 2017 unless prolonged. |
| (Belarus) Belovezhskaya Pushcha National Park | Visa not required | 3 days | Visitors must first obtain an electronic pass. |
| Crimea | Visa required | | Visa issued by Russia is required. |
| Turkish Republic of Northern Cyprus | Visa not required | 3 months | |
| (United Nations) UN Buffer Zone in Cyprus | Access Permit required | | Access Permit is required for travelling inside the zone, except Civil Use Areas. |
| Faroe Islands | Visa required | | |
| Gibraltar | Visa required | | UK Visa / Schengen residence permit covers entry. |
| Guernsey | Visa required | | UK Visa covers entry. |
| Isle of Man | Visa required | | UK Visa covers entry. |
| (Norway) Jan Mayen | Permit required | 24 hours | Permit issued by the local police required for staying for less than 24 hours and a permit issued by the Norwegian police for staying for more than 24 hours. |
| Jersey | Visa required | | UK Visa covers entry. |
| Kosovo | Visa not required | 90 days within any 6-month period in the Republic of Kosovo. | |
| Nagorno-Karabakh Republic | Visa required | | Travellers with Nagorno-Karabakh visa (expired or valid) or evidence of travel to Nagorno-Karabakh (stamps) will be permanently denied entry to Azerbaijan. |
| Novorossiya | Restricted area | | Crossing from Ukraine requires visit purpose to be explained to Ukrainian passport control on exit and those who entered from Russia are not allowed to proceed further into Ukraine. |
| Closed cities of Russia | Special authorization required | | Several closed cities and regions in Russia require special authorization. |
| Principality of Sealand | Visa required | | |
| South Ossetia | Visa not required | | Multiple entry visa to Russia and three-day prior notification are required to enter South Ossetia. |
| Svalbard | Visa not required | Unlimited (Svalbard Treaty) | No one requires a visa to enter Svalbard but it's practically impossible to board a flight/ferry to Svalbard without entering Norway. Hence a double entry Schengen visa would be required to go and come back from Svalbard to mainland Norway. |
| Transnistria | Visa not required | 24 hours | Registration required after 24h. |
Oceania
| American Samoa | Visa required | | |
| (Australia) Ashmore and Cartier Islands | Special authorization required | | A written authorization of the director of National Parks and Wildlife is required. |
| Christmas Island | Online Visitor visa (e600) required (if arriving from outside of the Australian Mainland) | | Passports and visas are not required when travelling from the Australian mainland. However, photographic identification must be produced for clearance through Customs and Immigration. Normal Australian Customs and Immigration procedures apply when entry is made from outside Australia. |
| (France) Clipperton Island | Special permit required | | Special permit required. |
| Cocos (Keeling) Islands | Online Visitor visa (e600) required (if arriving from outside of the Australian Mainland) | | Passports and visas are not required when travelling from the Australian mainland. However, photographic identification must be produced for clearance through Customs and Immigration. Normal Australian Customs and Immigration procedures apply when entry is made from outside Australia. |
| Cook Islands | Visa not required | 31 days | |
| (Australia) Coral Sea Islands | Special authorization required | | A written authorization of the director of National Parks and Wildlife is required. |
| French Polynesia | Visa required | | |
| Guam | Visa required | | |
| (Fiji) Lau Province | Special permission required | | |
| (Tasmania) Macquarie Island | Special authorization required | | A written authorization of the director of National Parks and Wildlife is required. |
| New Caledonia | Visa required | | |
| Niue | Visa not required | 30 days | |
| Norfolk Island | Online Visitor visa (e600) required (if arriving from outside of the Australian Mainland) | | As of 1 July 2016 all movements between Norfolk Island and Australian mainland are considered as domestic movements, however all passengers are still required to carry passports and pass Customs and Immigration. Normal Australian Customs and Immigration procedures apply when entry is made from outside Australia.; Passengers not carrying their passports are not eligible to purchase duty-free goods on Norfolk Island. |
| Northern Mariana Islands | Visa required | | |
| Pitcairn Islands | Visa not required | 14 days | Landing fee US$35 or tax of US$5 if not going ashore. |
| Tokelau | Entry permit required | | All visitors must obtain a permit to enter Tokelau from the Tokelau Apia Liaison Office in Apia, at least 2 weeks prior to travel. Tokelau can only be reached by boat from Samoa and a permit from the Samoan Immigration Authorities is required to leave and re-enter Samoa. |
| United States Minor Outlying Islands | Special permits required | | Special permits required for: Baker Island; Howland Island; Jarvis Island; Johnston Atoll; Kingman Reef; Midway Atoll; Palmyra Atoll; Wake Island |
| (France) Wallis and Futuna | Visa required | | |
South America
| (France) French Guiana | Visa required | | |
| Galápagos | Pre-registration required | | Online pre-registration is required. Transit Control Card must also be obtained at the airport prior to departure. |
South Atlantic and Antarctica
| Antarctica | Special permits required | | Special permits required for: Argentine Antarctica; (Australia) Australian Antarctic Territory; Bouvet Island; British Antarctic Territory; (Antártica Chilena Province) Chilean Antarctic Territory; French Southern and Antarctic Lands; (Australia) Heard Island and McDonald Islands; (Norway) Peter I Island; (Norway) Queen Maud Land; (New Zealand) Ross Dependency |
| Falkland Islands | Visa required | | |
| South Georgia and the South Sandwich Islands | Permit required | | Pre-arrival permit from the commissioner required (72 hours / 1 month for 110 / 160 pounds sterling). |

== Non-visa restrictions ==
=== Blank passport pages ===
Many countries require a minimum number of blank pages to be available in the passport being presented, typically one or two pages. Endorsement pages, which often appear after the visa pages, are not counted as being valid or available.

=== Vaccination ===
Cover of the new International Certificate of Vaccination issued by the Bureau of Quarantine in the Philippines since 2021

The African countries of Angola, Benin, Burkina Faso, Burundi, Cameroon, Central African Republic, Democratic Republic of the Congo, Republic of the Congo, Côte d'Ivoire, Gabon, Ghana, Guinea-Bissau, Mali, Niger, Sierra Leone and Togo, South Sudan and Uganda, along with French Guiana in South America, require all incoming passengers older than nine months to one year, to have a current International Certificate of Vaccination or Prophylaxis.

Some other countries require vaccination only if the passenger is coming from an infected area or has visited one recently or has transited for 12 hours in those countries: Algeria, Botswana, Cabo Verde, Chad, Djibouti, Egypt, Eswatini, Ethiopia, Gambia, Ghana, Guinea, Lesotho, Libya, Equatorial Guinea, Eritrea, Madagascar, Malawi, Mauritania, Mauritius, Mozambique, Namibia, Nigeria, Papua New Guinea, Seychelles, Somalia, South Africa, Sudan, Tunisia, Uganda, Tanzania, Zambia and Zimbabwe.

=== Passport validity length ===
Very few countries, such as Paraguay, just require a valid passport on arrival.

However many countries and groupings now require only an identity card – especially from their neighbours. Other countries may have special bilateral arrangements that depart from the generality of their passport validity length policies to shorten the period of passport validity required for each other's citizens or even accept passports that have already expired (but not been cancelled).

Some countries, such as Japan, Ireland and the United Kingdom, require a passport valid throughout the period of the intended stay.

In the absence of specific bilateral agreements, countries requiring passports to be valid for at least 6 more months on arrival include Afghanistan, Algeria, Anguilla, Bahrain, Bhutan, Botswana, British Virgin Islands, Brunei, Cambodia, Cameroon, Cape Verde, Cayman Islands, Central African Republic, Chad, Comoros, Costa Rica, Côte d'Ivoire, Curaçao, Ecuador, Egypt, El Salvador, Equatorial Guinea, Fiji, Gabon, Guinea Bissau, Guyana, Haiti, India, Indonesia, Iran, Iraq, Israel, Jordan, Kenya, Kiribati, Kuwait, Laos, Madagascar, Malaysia, Marshall Islands, Mongolia, Myanmar, Namibia, Nepal, Nicaragua, Nigeria, Oman, Palau, Papua New Guinea, Peru, Philippines, Qatar, Rwanda, Samoa, Saudi Arabia, Singapore, Solomon Islands, Somalia, Sri Lanka, Sudan, Suriname, Tanzania, Thailand, Timor-Leste, Tokelau, Tonga, Turkey, Tuvalu, Uganda, United Arab Emirates, Vanuatu, Venezuela, and Vietnam.

Countries requiring passports valid for at least 4 months on arrival include Micronesia and Zambia.

Countries requiring passports with a validity of at least 3 months beyond the date of intended departure include Azerbaijan, Bosnia and Herzegovina, Honduras, Montenegro, Nauru, Moldova and New Zealand. Similarly, the EEA countries of Iceland, Liechtenstein, Norway, all European Union countries (except Ireland) together with Switzerland also require 3 months validity beyond the date of the bearer's intended departure unless the bearer is an EEA or Swiss national.

Countries requiring passports valid for at least 3 months on arrival include Albania, North Macedonia, Panama, and Senegal.

Bermuda requires passports to be valid for at least 45 days upon entry.

Countries that require a passport validity of at least one month beyond the date of intended departure include Eritrea, Hong Kong, Lebanon, Macau, the Maldives and South Africa.

==== Maximum passport age ====
Countries of the Schengen area require non-EU passports to be less than 10 years old upon entry.

=== Criminal record ===
Some countries, including Australia, Canada, Fiji, New Zealand and the United States, routinely deny entry to non-citizens who have a criminal record, while others impose restrictions depending on the type of conviction and the length of the sentence.

=== Persona non grata ===
The government of a country can declare a diplomat persona non grata, banning them from entering the country or expelling them if they have already entered. In non-diplomatic use, the authorities of a country may also declare a foreigner persona non grata permanently or temporarily, usually because of unlawful activity.

=== Israeli stamps ===
Kuwait, Lebanon, Libya, and Yemen do not allow entry to people with passport stamps from Israel or whose passports have either a used or an unused Israeli visa, or where there is evidence of previous travel to Israel such as entry or exit stamps from neighbouring border posts in transit countries such as Jordan and Egypt.

To circumvent this Arab League boycott of Israel, the Israeli immigration services have now mostly ceased to stamp foreign nationals' passports on either entry to or exit from Israel (unless the entry is for some work-related purposes). Since 15 January 2013, Israel no longer stamps foreign passports at Ben Gurion Airport. Passports are still (as of 22 June 2017) stamped at Erez when passing into and out of Gaza.

Iran refuses admission to holders of passports containing an Israeli visa or stamp that is less than 12 months old.

=== Biometrics ===
Several countries mandate that all travellers, or all foreign travellers, be fingerprinted on arrival and will refuse admission to or even arrest travellers who refuse to comply. In some countries, such as the United States, this may apply even to transit passengers who merely wish to change planes rather than go landside.

Fingerprinting countries/regions include Afghanistan, Argentina, Brunei, Cambodia, China, Ethiopia, Ghana, Guinea, India, Japan, Kenya (both fingerprints and a photo are taken), Malaysia upon entry and departure, Mongolia, Saudi Arabia, the Schengen Area, Singapore, South Korea, Taiwan, Thailand, Uganda, the United Arab Emirates and the United States.

Many countries also require a photo be taken of people entering the country. The United States, which does not fully implement exit control formalities at its land frontiers (although long mandated by its own legislation), intends to implement facial recognition for passengers departing from international airports to identify people who overstay their visa.

Together with fingerprint and face recognition, iris scanning is one of three biometric identification technologies internationally standardised since 2006 by the International Civil Aviation Organization (ICAO) for use in e-passports and the United Arab Emirates conducts iris scanning on visitors who need to apply for a visa. The United States Department of Homeland Security has announced plans to greatly increase the biometric data it collects at US borders. In 2018, Singapore began trials of iris scanning at three land and maritime immigration checkpoints.

== See also ==
- Visa policy of Jordan
- Jordanian passport
