= Tashi =

Tashi, also spelled Trashi (Tibetan: བཀྲ་ཤིས་, Wylie: bkra shis, THL: tra shi), is a Tibetan word meaning "good fortune" or "auspiciousness". Tashi or tashe may refer to:

== People ==
- Dagpo Tashi Namgyal, 16th-century Tibetan scholar
- Guru Tashi, legendary ancestor of the Sikkimese royal family
- Ngawang Tashi Bapu (born 1968), musician known as "Lama Tashi"
- Tashi Choden (born 1998), Bhutanese model and beauty pageant titleholder
- Tashi Lama, another name for Tibet's Panchen Lama
- Tashi Namgyal (1893–1963), king of Sikkim, 1914–1963
- Tashi Peljor (born 1978), Bhutanese Olympic archer
- Tashi Tsering (disambiguation), several people
- Tashi Tenzing (born 1965), Sherpa mountaineer
- Tashi Wangdi (1947–2025), official in the Tibetan government-in-exile

== Places ==
- Tashi, Longyou County (塔石镇), a town in Longyou County, Zhejiang, PR China
- Tashi Dor, a peninsula on Namtso Lake, Tibet
- Tashi Lhunpo Monastery, Shigatse, Tibet
- Tashi Yangtse, the administrative center of Tashi Yangtse District, Bhutan

== Other uses ==
- Tashi (dip), a Meze dish made from tahini, garlic, salt and lemon juice
- Tashi, a series of children's books by Anna Fienberg
  - Tashi (TV series), a television adaptation of the book series
- Tashi delek, a Tibetan all-purpose greeting with the meaning of "blessings and good luck".
- Tashi Group, a privately owned industrial/commercial group in Bhutan
- Tashi Namgyal Academy, a public school in Sikkim, India
- Tashi Quartet, an American ensemble of classical musicians, originally formed in 1973 as "Tashi"
- Tashi Duncan, from the film Challengers

== See also ==
- Tashigang (disambiguation)
