= Tashigang =

Tashigang (Tibetan: བཀྲ་ཤིས་སྒང་, Wylie: bkra shis sgang, THL: tra shi gang), also spelt Trashigang and Zhaxigang, is a place name in the Tibetan language meaning "good fortune ridge". It may refer to:

- Tashigang, Ngari Prefecture in western Tibet
- Tashi Nang Township, a township in Dinggyê County, Tibet Autonomous Region
- Tashigang, Sa'gya, a township in Sa'gya County, Tibet Autonomous Region
- Tashigang, Lhatse, a township in Lhatse County, Tibet Autonomous Region
- Tashigang, Himachal Pradesh in India
- Trashigang District in Bhutan
  - Trashigang, a town in the Trashigang District of Bhutan
  - Trashigang Dzong, a fortified monastery in the Trashigang District of Bhutan

== See also ==
- Tashi (disambiguation)
