= Blue Card (European Union) =

Type of work permit for the European Union

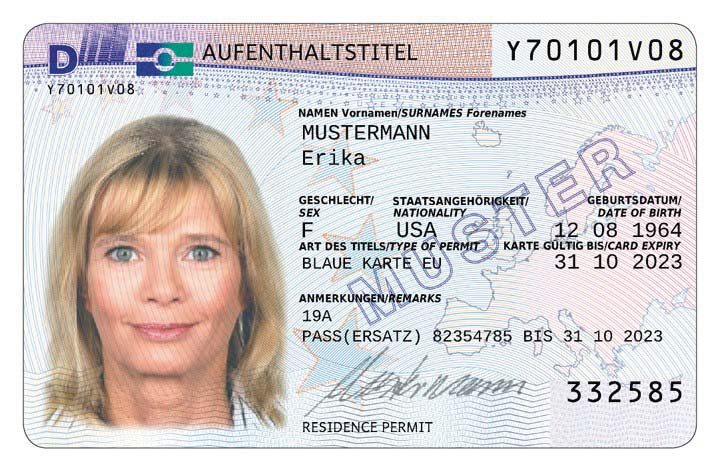
Template of a German Electronic Residence Permit for a Blue Card (front side) as of December 2019

The blue card is an approved EU-wide work permit (Directive (EU) 2021/1883) allowing highly skilled non-EU citizens to work and live in 25 of the 27 countries within the European Union excluding Denmark and Ireland, which are not subject to the proposal. However, according to new rules, if it is a business trip, it does allow entry to a Schengen area member country if the country issuing the Blue Card is not a member of the Schengen area (like EU member Cyprus). The term Blue Card was coined by the think tank Bruegel, inspired by the United States' green card (known officially as a permanent resident card) and making reference to the European flag which is blue with twelve golden stars.

The blue card proposal presented by the European Commission offers a one-track procedure for non-EU citizens to apply for a work permit, which would be valid for up to three years, but can be renewed thereafter. Blue card status also carries other rights, such as favourable family reunification rules. The proposal also encourages geographic mobility within the EU, between different member states, for those who have been granted a blue card. The legal basis for this proposal was Article 63(3) and (4) of the Treaty of Rome (now Article 79 TFEU).

== Proposal ==
The blue card proposal was presented at a press conference in Strasbourg on 23 October 2007, by the President of the European Commission José Manuel Barroso and Commissioner for Justice, Freedom and Security Franco Frattini. Barroso explained the motives behind the proposal as: The EU's future lack of labour and skills; the difficulty for third country workers to move between different member states for work purposes; the conflicting admission procedures for the 27 different member states, and the "rights gap" between EU citizens and legal immigrants. The proposal was presented along with another proposal, COM(2007)638, which includes a simplified application procedure and a common set of rights for legal third-country workers. The name 'blue card' is chosen to signal potential immigrants that the blue card is the European alternative to the US green card. The colour blue is the predominant colour of European Union flags and logos.

== International reaction ==
Shortly after the proposal was presented, it received heavy criticism from governments of developing countries, for its perceived functionality in snatching up talented workers. South African Minister of Health Manto Tshabalala-Msimang pointed to the fact that several African countries already suffer from the migration of skilled health workers and said that this proposal might worsen the situation. Moroccan international economic law professor Tajeddine El Husseini went further, saying that this "is a new form of colonisation, of discrimination, and it will be very hard to find support for it among southern countries".

A 2011 thesis by A. Björklund on Possible Impacts of the EU Blue Card Directive on Developing Countries of Origin through Migration of Skilled Workers with a focus on the Republic of Mali concludes that skilled Malian migrants in general seem to depart with the intention at the outset to return to their home country after a certain period of time, bringing with them significant human capital in the forms of skills, experience, information and a different view on methods of working. During their stay abroad, remittances from expatriates often represent an important source of income to the country of origin.

== Approval ==
On 20 November 2008 the European Parliament backed the introduction of the blue card while recommending some safeguards against brain drain and advocated greater flexibility for EU Member States. Many of these suggestions, though, were ignored in the subsequent legislation which was passed on 25 May 2009. Some compromises were made, as "Member States to set quotas on Blue Card holders or to ban them altogether if they see fit." The Blue Card rules also could run into problems with the European Permanent Residency Directive. Some EU Member States are not in compliance with implementing the EU Blue Card program. Despite having been warned in July 2011, Austria, Cyprus and Greece have not yet transposed the rules of the Blue Card Directive, which should have been implemented before 19 June 2011. Today revision of this card is a highly debated topic. The COVID-19 pandemic exposed the aging and shrinking skilled work force in the health sector. Council Directive 2009/50/EC was repealed and replaced by Directive (EU) 2021/1883 with effect from 19 November 2023.

== Implementation ==
As of August 2020, European countries vary wildly in the number of issued Blue Cards. Cyprus, Greece and Netherlands have not yet issued any cards, while Germany in the lead had issued 27,000, followed by France with 1,500.

Even years after the transposition deadline passed, some Member States (such as Spain and Belgium) have yet to fully enact the law or give the rights fully promised in the directive. Already, think tanks have presented ideas designed to supplement the Blue Card and its weaknesses.

Germany had enacted the Blue Card legislation partially as of April 2012 focusing on language skills and areas of need such as engineering, mathematics and IT. As of 1 January 2014, Germany had given out 7,000 Blue Cards. 4,000 of these were given to foreigners who were already living in Germany. However, as of 1 January 2018, Germany is still unable to issue Blue Cards for workers that are eligible due to experience.

A dedicated EU Blue Card section was added to the EU Immigration Portal on 7 June 2016. The site provides country-specific information to potential Blue Card applicants. It states that only EU Member State authorities may issue Blue Cards and warns against any unofficial application sites which may contain incorrect information or charge for their services.

== Requirements ==
To apply for a blue card, applicants must:

- prove "higher professional qualifications" (education of 3+ years equivalent of 180 credits of tertiary education, or relevant work experience of 5+ years)
- fulfill the legal requirements, for regulated professions
- work as a paid employee - the EU Blue Card does not apply to self-employed work or entrepreneurs
- have the necessary travel documents and health insurance
- have a work contract or binding job offer in an EU country for at least one year, with a salary of at least 1.2 times the country's average gross annual salary

After obtaining the blue card, the applicant may need to notify the immigration services if he or she changes jobs within 12 months and will be eligible for long-term mobility to other EU member states after 12 months.

== Benefits ==
The blue card is designed to make it easier for a highly skilled worker to move to the European Union and provides some advantages over other types of residence permit. For example, Germany provides the following benefits to blue card holders:

- simplified procedure for obtaining a visa to move to Germany,
- obtaining a permanent residence permit after 27 months, and with certain knowledge of the language already after 21 months,
- the spouse of the blue card holder does not need to have knowledge of German when moving. Also, the spouse is allowed to carry out labor activities after moving.

== See also ==
- Chinese Foreign Permanent Resident Identity Card
- Long-term resident (European Union)
