= Global Leaders Group on Antimicrobial Resistance =

The Global Leaders Group on Antimicrobial Resistance consists of world leaders and experts from across sectors working together to accelerate political action on antimicrobial resistance (AMR).

The Group performs an independent global advisory and advocacy role and works to maintain urgency, public support, political momentum and visibility of the AMR challenge on the global health and development agenda.

== Mission statement ==
"The Global Leaders Group on Antimicrobial Resistance collaborates globally with governments, agencies, civil society and the private sector through a One Health approach to advise on and advocate for prioritized political actions for the mitigation of drug resistant infections through responsible and sustainable access to and use of antimicrobials."

== Background ==
The Global Leaders Group on Antimicrobial Resistance was established in November 2020 following the recommendation of the Interagency Coordination Group on Antimicrobial Resistance to strengthen global political momentum and leadership on AMR. The inaugural meeting of the Group took place in January 2021.

The Quadripartite Joint Secretariat (QJS) on Antimicrobial Resistance, a joint effort by the Food and Agriculture Organization of the United Nations (FAO), the United Nations Environment Programme (UNEP), the World Health Organization (WHO), and the World Organisation for Animal Health (WOAH) provide secretariat support for the Group.

== Members and Chair ==
=== Chair ===
The Global Leaders Group on Antimicrobial Resistance is chaired by Her Excellency Mia Amor Mottley, Prime Minister of Barbados.

=== Members ===
The Group includes members from across different sectors and countries including heads of state, serving or former ministers and/or senior government officials (acting in their individual capacities), senior representatives of foundations and civil society organizations and leaders from the private sector.

Current Group members:

1. Christopher Fearne, Deputy Prime Minister and Minister for European Funds, Social Dialogue and Consumer Protection, Member of Parliament, MALTA, GLG vice-chair
2. Ahmed Mohammed Obaid Al Saidi, Minister of Health, SULTANATE OF OMAN
3. Mr Mohammed Mousa Alameeri, Assistant Undersecretary for the Food Diversity Sector, Ministry of Climate Change and Environment, UNITED ARAB EMIRATES
4. Ms Beatrice Atim Odwong Anywar, Minister of State for Environment, UGANDA
5. António Correia de Campos, Former Minister of Health, Professor Emeritus of Health Economics, National School of Public Health, New University of Lisbon, PORTUGAL
6. C.O. Onyebuchi Chukwu, Former Minister of Health, Professor of Orthopaedic Surgery, Alex Ekwueme Federal University Ndufu Alike, NIGERIA
7. Guilherme Antônio da Costa Júnior, Senior Agricultural Attaché, Mission of Brazil to the European Union, Chairperson of the Codex Alimentarius Commission, BRAZIL
8. Dame Sally Davies, UK Special Envoy on Antimicrobial Resistance, UNITED KINGDOM
9. Maggie De Block, Former Minister of Social Affairs and Public Health, and Asylum and Migration, Member of Parliament, BELGIUM
10. Mr Jakob Forssmed, Minister of Social Affairs and Public Health, SWEDEN
11. Ms Grace Fu, Minister for Sustainability and the Environment, Member of Parliament, SINGAPORE
12. Jamie Jonker, Chief Science Officer, National Milk Producers Federation (NMPF), USA
13. Ernst Kuipers, Minister of Health, Welfare and Sport, NETHERLANDS
14. Ms Sunita Narain, Director-General, Centre for Science and Environment, INDIA
15. Mr Yasuhisa Shiozaki, Former Minister of Health, Labour and Welfare, Member of the House of Representatives, JAPAN
16. Ms Dechen Wangmo, Minister of Health, BHUTAN
17. Jeffrey Scott Weese, Professor at the University of Guelph, Director of the Centre for Public Health and Zoonoses, Chief of Infection Control at Ontario Veterinary College, CANADA
18. Lothar H. Wieler, Chair of the Digital Health Cluster, Hasso Plattner Institute and Prof of Digital Global Public Health, GERMANY
19. Ms Jennifer Zachary, Executive Vice President, General Counsel, Merck & Co., Inc., UNITED STATES OF AMERICA

=== Ex-officio members ===
1. QU Dongyu, Director-General, Food and Agriculture Organization of the United Nations
2. Ms Inger Anderson, Under-Secretary-General, United Nations and executive director, UN Environment Programme
3. Tedros Adhanom Ghebreyesus, Director-General, World Health Organization
4. Monique Eloit, Director General, World Organisation for Animal Health

=== Former members ===
1. Sheikh Hasina, Prime Minister of Bangladesh
2. Ms Lena Hallengren, Minister of Health and Social Affairs, SWEDEN
3. Mr Jean-Christophe Flatin, President of Innovation, Science, Technology & Mars Edge, Mars, Inc. USA
4. Julie Gerberding, Chief Patient Officer and Executive Vice President, Population Health & Sustainability, Merck & Co., Inc., USA
5. Mr Kenneth C. Frazier Chairman of the Board and chief executive officer Merck & Co., Inc., USA
6. Sir Jeremy James Farrar, Director, Wellcome Trust, UNITED KINGDOM
