= Kezang Wangmo =

Bhutanese singer, actress, and politician

Kezang Wangmo is a Bhutanese politician, actress, poet, singer, dancer and goodwill ambassador for organic farming in Bhutan. Kezang was born in Paro District, in western Bhutan, where she learned to act at her school.

== Professional career ==
Before becoming an actress, Kezang was recognized as a singer from her country, with a hit local-song "A La La Ngi Sem". She starred in various films in Bhutan and rapidly gained fame which brought her 2 national awards, including the best newcomer, and best female lead actor for her role in Sem Gi Damtse.

== Political career ==
She joined politics in 2013.

She was elected to the National Assembly of Bhutan as a candidate of People's Democratic Party from Dokar-Sharpa constituency in 2013 Bhutanese National Assembly election. She received 3,571 votes and defeated Chencho Dorji, a candidate of Druk Phuensum Tshogpa.

== Filmography ==
=== Film ===
| Year | Title | Role |
|---|---|---|
| 2003 | Travelers and Magicians | Pelzang |
| 2010 | The Destiny | |
| 2016 | Patterns of Love | Chokimo |
| | Sem Gi Damtse | |

=== Television ===
| Year | Title | Role | Note |
|---|---|---|---|
| 2015 | Coopers Mountain | As Herself | Documentary Film |

== See also ==
- The Destiny, A Film which Kezang Wangmo also starred in.
