= The Destiny =

Tashi ki Mitshey. The Destiny
- Directed by: Rinchen Namgay
- Written by: Rinchen Khandu
- Story by: About "A Young Boy"
- Produced by: Tashi Gyeltshem
- Starring: Nguldrub Dorji and Kezang Wangmo
- Cinematography: Rinzang
- Edited by: Rinzang
- Music by: Karma
- Release date: August 9, 2010
- Country: Bhutan
- Language: Dzongkha
- Budget: 200000 Nu

The Destiny is a Bhutanese Dzongkha language film written by Tshewang Rinzin and directed by Kezang P Jigme. This film was released on August 9, 2010.

== Plot ==
Based on a true life story, “The Destiny” is the journey of a young boy who is out to find his independence and more importantly- his father.

A father abandons his wife and unborn child to find greener pastures elsewhere, namely- the capital city. The child is born soon after and it is a son. He is brought up by his mother in the East.

Following the death of his mother the boy now aspires to go to Thimphu with one wish- to see his father.

If I talk little about a film, a young boy (Nguldrub Dorji) who is orphan at a very young age and goes through many hardships. He lives in his village and moves to Paro and after a while gets adopted by a rich family. He is warmly welcomed into the new home by his new father and sister (Pema Yangki) but is mistreated by the mother. Tension arise in the family as the new mother begins to torment him and later on accuses him of stealing. She sends him out of the house to the dismay of the father and sister who have now grown very fond of him. After he leaves the house, misfortune befalls the family without his knowledge. Karma Choechong moves to the city in search of a job and does odd jobs for his livelihood till he finds one. He meets Kezang Wangmo who helps him look for a job and settles down. After a few years, he becomes a very rich and successful businessman . In the end it shows how fate brings the two siblings together because of their love and compassion for each other.

== Songs ==
- "Phama Mapay Bu Ngye"
- "Rang Sem Gye Wai Bhum"

== Production ==
The film is produced by Tashi Gyeltshem.
