= Zango =

Zango may refer to:

- Zango (album), a 2023 studio album by Witch
- Zango (company), a former software company
- Zango, Angola, a town near Luanda, Angola
- Zango, Nigeria, a local government area in Katsina, Nigeria
- Zongo settlements, areas in West African towns populated mostly by settlers from Northern Sahel areas
- Hugues Fabrice Zango (born 1993), Burkinabé triple jumper

== See also ==
- Zongo (disambiguation)
