= Tashi Tsering =

Tashi Tsering or Tshering may refer to:

- Tashi Tsering (educator) (1929–2014), Tibetan educator, writer, and editor
- Tashi Tsering (Australian Geshe) (born 1937), Tibetan Buddhist teacher
- Tashi Tsering (Jamyang Buddhist Centre) (born 1958), Tibetan Buddhist teacher, abbot of Sera Mey Monastic University
- Tashi Tsering (tibetologist) (born 1960), tibetologist, historian, and writer
- Tashi Tsering (footballer) (born 1973), Tibetan and Nepalese footballer
- Tashi Tshering (Sikkimese politician), first Chief Minister of the Kingdom of Sikkim in 1949
