= Dorjee Wangmo =

Bhutanese politician

Member of the National Assembly of Bhutan
- Incumbent
- Assumed office 31 October 2018
- Preceded by: Tshering Tobgay
- Constituency: Sombaykha

Personal details
- Born: c. 1988
- Party: Druk Nyamrup Tshogpa (DNT)

Dorjee Wangmo (རྡོ་རྗེ་དབང་མོ; born c. 1988) is a Bhutanese politician who has been a member of the National Assembly of Bhutan, since October 2018.

== Education ==
She holds a BSc degree in Computer Science.

== Political career ==
Prior to entering politics, she has served as an ICT officer.

Wangmo was elected to the National Assembly of Bhutan as a candidate of DNT from Sombaykha constituency in 2018 Bhutanese National Assembly election. She received 1,536 votes and defeated Tshewang Rinzin, a candidate of Druk Phuensum Tshogpa.
