= Long-term resident (European Union) =

A long-term resident in the European Union is a person who is not a citizen of an EU country but has resided legally and continuously within its territory for five years with a means of support (i.e. without recourse to the social assistance system of the host country) and fulfills some further requirements, as defined in Directive 2003/109/EC. The status permits the holder some of the rights of free movement afforded to EU/EEA citizens in the participating countries; of the EU countries Denmark and Ireland (and, prior to its withdrawal, the United Kingdom) do not participate in implementing the Directive. The implementation of the directive is left to the participating countries, with some national variations in the requirements for and benefits of long-term resident status.

== Participating countries ==
Countries participating in the implementation of the directive include:

- Austria (German: Daueraufenthalt – EU)
- Belgium (French: Résident de longue durée – UE, Dutch: EG – langdurig ingezetene)
- Bulgaria (Bulgarian: дългосрочно пребиваващ в ЕC)
- Croatia (Croatian: Osoba s dugotrajnim boravištem – EZ)
- Cyprus (Long term resident – EC)
- Czech Republic (Czech: Povolení k pobytu pro dlouhodobě pobývajícího rezidenta – ES)
- Estonia (Estonian: Pikaajaline elanik – EÜ)
- Finland (Finnish: P EY 2003/109 EY, Swedish: P EG 2003/109 EG)
- France (French: Carte de résident de longue durée – UE)
- Germany (German: Daueraufenthalt – EU)
- Greece (Greek: επί μακρόν διαμένων – ΕΚ)
- Hungary (Hungarian: Huzamos tartózkodási engedéllyel rendelkező – EK or EK letelepedési engedély)
- Italy (Italian: Permesso di soggiorno UE per soggiornanti di lungo periodo or Soggiornante di lungo periodo – UE)
- Latvia (Latvian: Eiropas Savienības pastāvīgā iedzīvotāja statuss – ES)
- Lithuania (Lithuanian: Ilgalaikis gyventojas – EB)
- Luxembourg (French: Resident de longue durée – UE)
- Malta (Maltese: Resident fit-tul – UE)
- Netherlands (Dutch: EG – langdurig ingezetene)
- Poland (Polish: Pobyt rezydenta długoterminowego UE)
- Portugal (Portuguese: Residente CE de longa duração)
- Romania (Romanian: Rezident pe termen lung - UE or Permis de sedere pe termen lung - UE)
- Slovakia (Slovak: Osoba s dlhodobým pobytom – ES)
- Slovenia (Slovene: Rezident za daljši čas – ES)
- Spain (Spanish: Residente de larga duración – UE)
- Sweden (Swedish: Varaktigt bosatt - EG)

== Implementation by country ==
=== Czech Republic ===
A person holding a permanent residence permit along with a legal status of “EU long-term resident” of another EU Member State (hereinafter referred to as “a resident of another EU member state”) is entitled to file an application for a long-term residence permit if he/she intends to temporarily reside in the Czech Republic for more than 3 months.

=== Finland ===
Holders of an eligible residence permit (excluding asylum) can after five years of residence apply for status as a long-term EU resident in Finland, providing they have not resided outside the country for more than six months at a time and ten months in total. This status can be withdrawn if the holder has continuously resided outside the EU for more than two years, or outside Finland for more than six years.

Those holding long-term EU resident status from another EU country wishing to reside in Finland may do so from that country or in Finland.

=== Netherlands ===
In order to acquire status as a long-term EU resident in the Netherlands, one must pass the civic integration exam; have five consecutive years of residence in the Netherlands; and have, at the time of application, a residence permit (Dutch: verblijfstitel) without a "temporary purpose". Time spent on a residence permit as a student counts for half, while time spent on a different residence permit with a "temporary purpose" does not count (but does not break the continuity of stay). Exceptions include holders of a Blue Card, who need only evidence 24 months' stay with a total of five years of residence within the EU. Additionally, status holders coming for employment will only require a work permit for the first 12 months, as opposed to the ordinary five years.

=== Sweden ===
Before 2019, the law was such that, in order to acquire status as a long-term EU resident in Sweden, one must have resided in Sweden continuously for five years on residence permits (Swedish: uppehållstillstånd) and have a permanent residence permit (Swedish: permanent uppehållstillstånd). Since 2019, a person who has stayed in Sweden for five years without interruption with a residence permit or "legally resident in another way" may apply for long-term resident status. This law change was made so that British citizens living in Sweden after Brexit would be able to apply for the status, because otherwise they would have been ineligible given they have lived in Sweden under right of residence, not with residence permits.

The person applying must also have a means of supporting themselves. However, time on visitor's residence permit or residence permit for studies, among others, cannot be counted towards this time.

Long-term EU residents moving to Sweden are required to apply for a residence permit if they stay for more than 90 days. They are however permitted to begin work or studies upon arrival, without waiting for a decision in such case. A work permit (Swedish: arbetstillstånd) is not required for a long-term EU resident, however a hiring certificate must be submitted for such residents applying on the grounds of employment.

== Reception ==
Following the deadline for the introduction of a specific immigration status as a long-term resident of the European Union in 2006, the Directive was found to affect a relatively small percentage of the third-country nationals in most participating countries. Additionally, of these, few used their mobility rights within the EU.

Main reasons cited for lack of adoption are the following:

- the lack of information available about the LTR status among third-country nationals
- the lack of information available about the LTR status among national migration administrations
- the "competition" with national schemes:
  - national long-term residence permits, and
  - possibility to obtain EU citizenship in 5 years or shorter time in some countries
- the "competition" with the Blue Card (European Union)
- integration requirements

Main reasons cited for lack of intra-EU mobility for third-country nationals with LTR are the following:

- labour market restrictions and labour market tests in States different than those in which they originally resided
- administrative barriers
- recognition of degrees and diplomas
- integration requirements
- other forms of discrimination

Other reasons:

- long-term resident permits issued in one EU country ('first Member State') are exchanged to non-long-term resident permits in a new country ('second Member State')
- new family members (child birth, marriage) of LTR holders are not granted LTR status, but are required to fulfill general LTR requirements first, i.e. five years with a means of support, etc.

== Additional information ==
According to the chapter IV, Article 24 of the Directive, periodically the Commission reports to the European Parliament and to the Council on the application of this Directive in the Member States and proposes amendments as may be necessary. Reports provide information on specifics of application of the Directive in national legislation systems, as well as statistics of adoption of this type of residence permit.

There were 2,861,306 long-term residents by the end of 2018, with 69.8% of them with permit issued by Italy.

== Brexit and UK nationals with long-term EU residence ==
Long-term EU residence is what is recommended by Commission to be granted to UK nationals after Brexit, who lived in EU countries for more than 5 years. The rights obtained by UK nationals after converting to third-country nationals with LTR status would be significantly reduced in comparison to the set of rights exercised by them previously while being EU citizens.

== See also ==
- Blue Card (European Union)
