= Dechen Wangmo (politician) =

Bhutanese politician

Dasho Dechen Wangmo
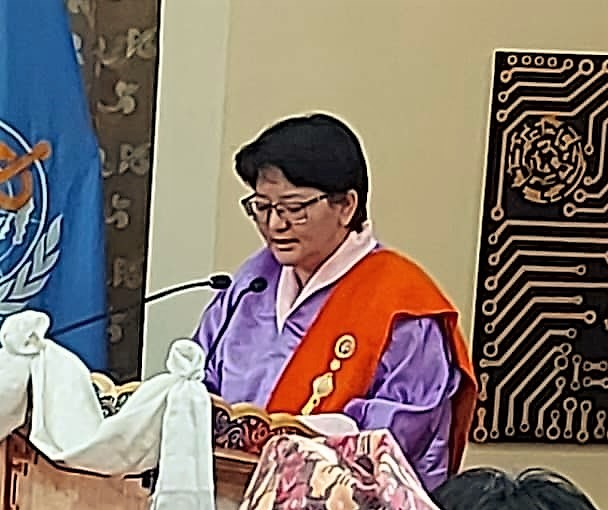
- Dechen Wangmo at the 75th Session of the WHO Regional Committee for South-East Asia

Minister for Health
- In office 7 November 2018 – 2023
- Prime Minister: Lotay Tshering
- Preceded by: Tandin Wangchuk

Member of the National Assembly of Bhutan
- In office 31 October 2018 – 2023
- Preceded by: Tshering
- Succeeded by: Tshering
- Constituency: North Thimphu

Personal details
- Born: c. 1976
- Party: Druk Nyamrup Tshogpa
- Education: Yale University; Northeastern University

Dasho Dechen Wangmo (c. 1976) is a Bhutanese politician who was a Minister for Health from November 2018 to 2023. She was a member of the National Assembly of Bhutan, since October 2018 to 2023.

== Early life and education ==
Wangmo was born on c. 1976.

She received a Master of Public Health (Global Health Epidemiology) degree from Yale University, United States and Bachelor of Science in Cardiopulmonary Science from the Northeastern University, United States.

== Professional career ==
Wangmo served as the director of PIE Solutions. She is the chairwoman and a founding member of Bhutan Cancer Society, a non-profit organization in Bhutan.

== Political career ==
Wangmo is a member of Druk Nyamrup Tshogpa (DNT).

She was elected to the National Assembly of Bhutan in the 2018 elections for the North Thimphu constituency. She received 2,276 votes and defeated Lily Wangchuk, a candidate of Druk Phuensum Tshogpa.

On November 3, Lotay Tshering formally announced his cabinet structure and Wangmo was named as Minister for Health. On November 7, 2018, she was sworn in as Minister for Health in the cabinet of Prime Minister Lotay Tshering.

Since 2020, Wangmo has also been a member of the Global Leaders Group on Antimicrobial Resistance, co-chaired by Sheikh Hasina and Mia Mottley.

== Honours ==
=== National honours ===
- Bhutan :
  - The Royal Red Scarf (17/12/2020).

Political offices
Preceded by Tandin Wangchuk	Minister for Health; 2018–present	Incumbent
