= Dechen Zangmo =

Bhutanese politician

Member of the National Assembly
- In office 9 November 2013 – 1 August 2018
- Constituency: Nanong Shumar

Personal details
- Party: Bhutan Peace and Prosperity Party (DPT)

Dechen Zangmo is a Bhutanese politician who has been a Bhutan Peace and Prosperity Party (DPT) member of the National Assembly of Bhutan 2013 to 2018.
