= Dechen Pem =

- Born: Paro, Bhutan
- Genres: Rigsar
- Occupations: Singer, Producer and Actress

Dechen Pem is a Bhutanese singer. She started singing in 1994 and had an album produced through Norling Drayang.

She won numerous awards including the award for Best Playback Singer (Female) at the 8th National Film Awards as well as the award for Best Playback Singer (Female) at the 1st Viewers Choice Awards’

Dechen pem is cited as one of the veteran rigsar singer in Bhutan. She is currently judging the National Singing Competition, Druk Super Star organized by actor Kencho Wangdi.

== Personal life ==
She was born in Paro, Bhutan and raised in Nobgang, Punakha District.

She is married and has two children.

In 1993, she joined the Teacher Training College in Paro and upon graduation became a teacher. However, by 2005 she had returned to singing as well as film making.

== Songs ==
Final Cry (film)

- Phu Ru Ru Ru
- Zamling Miee Bumo

Perfect Girl (film)

- Tendre
- Gawai Semten

Norbu My Beloved Yak (film)

- Gang Thowai
- Olo Lo Lai
- Gungsa Yala

Golden Cup (film)

- Gangchen
- Gesar Shichham

Arunachal Pradesh to Thimphu (film)

- So Ya So Ya
- Ha Hu..
- Tawang Bazer
- Tharingsa

== Films ==
1. Sergyel
2. Sem Gai Demtse
3. Sem Hingi Sangtam

== Awards ==
She has won eight awards for best playback singing.

Best female playback singer for Sem Gi Damtse
