= Wamrong =

- Location in Bhutan
- Coordinates: 27°4′N 91°34′E
- Country: Bhutan
- District: Trashigang District
- Time zone: UTC+6 (BTT)

Wamrong is a hill town in Trashigang District in eastern Bhutan. It is located along the highway between Trashigang and Samdrup Jongkhar. The post code of Wamrong town is 42004.

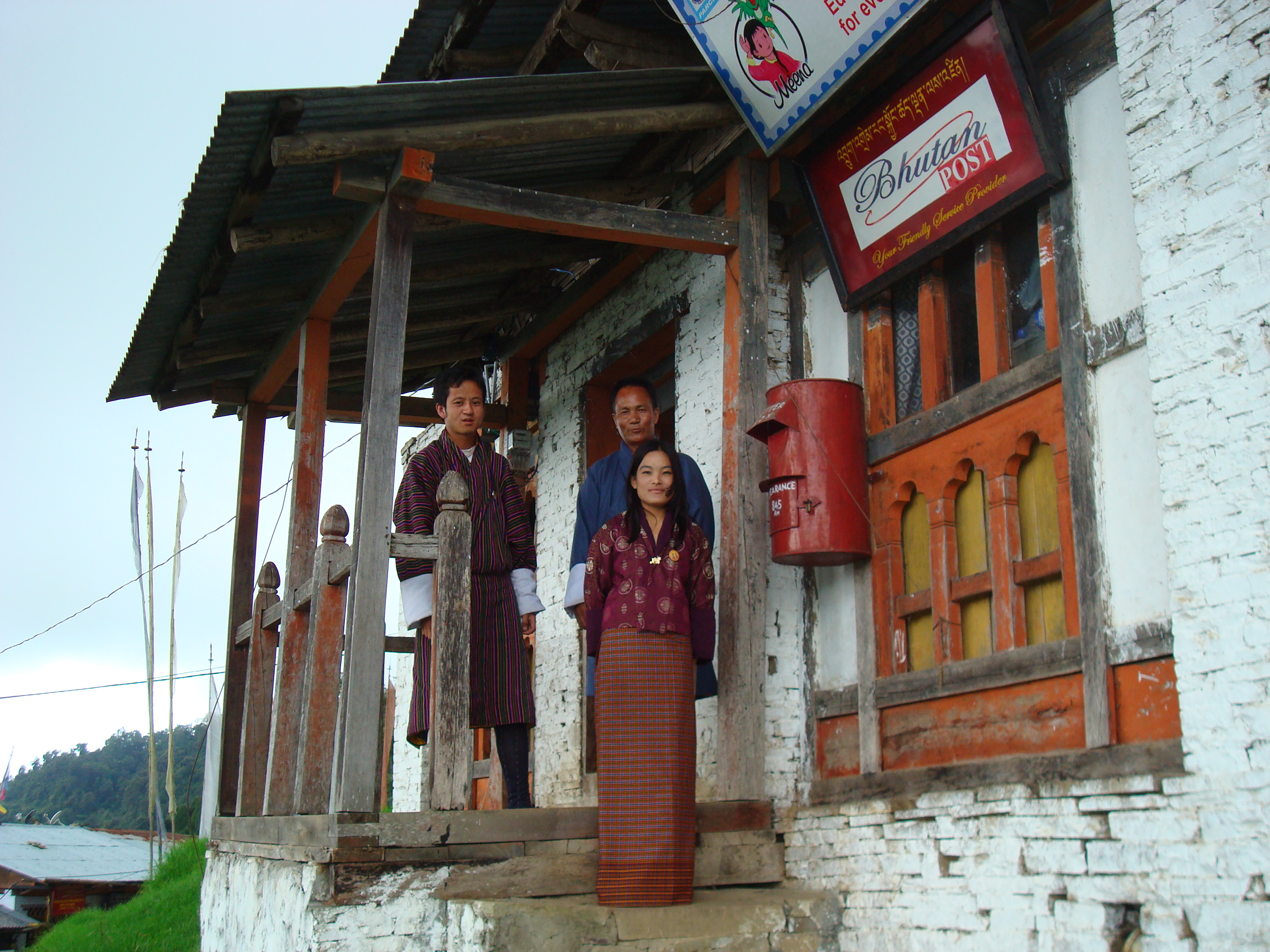
Postmistress in front of Wamrong Post Office in east Bhutan, 2008

Wamrong is a small village in Trashigang in east Bhutan. Located on a ridge overlooking Samdrup Jongkhar, the village is well placed between the towns of Trashigang and Samdrup Jongkhar, and most of the inter-district buses and vehicles plying this route stop for meal breaks here. As a result, the village has developed a reputation for good, cheap food. All the buses from Mongar and Trashigang traveling to and from Samdrup Jongkhar make stops here. There's a great view down the mountains to the Assamese plain.

The terrain around Wamrong is mountainous, with the highest nearby point at 1,935 meters above sea level, 1.3 km southeast of Wamrong.

The surrounding area is predominantly covered in mixed forest.

The climate in the area is humid and subtropical. The average annual temperature in the district is 11°C. The warmest month is June, when the average temperature is 14°C, and the coldest is January at 6°C. The average annual precipitation is 1,606 mm. The wettest month is June, with an average of 324 mm of rainfall, and the driest is November, with approximately 2 mm of precipitation.
