= Pema Rinchen =

Bhutanese footballer and manager

Personal information
- Full name: Pema Rinchen
- Date of birth: 20 February 1986 (age 40)
- Place of birth: Thimphu, Bhutan
- Height: 1.68 m (5 ft 6 in)
- Position: Defender

Senior career*
Years	Team	Apps	(Gls)
2008–2015	Yeedzin		

International career
2009–2019	Bhutan	14	(0)
2009–2016	Bhutan (futsal)		
- * Club domestic league appearances and goals

Pema Rinchen is a Bhutanese former football player and manager. He plays as a defender. He won the A-Division in 2008, 2010 and 2011 and participated in the AFC President's Cup as member of the Yeedzin in 2009 and 2011.

== International career ==
Pema Rinchen is a member of the Bhutanese national team and played for the team in the South Asian Games in 2006 and 2010. He also represented Bhutan in the SAFF Championship in 2008 and 2011 as well as the AFC Challenge Cup in 2008 and 2010.

He has represented Bhutan in all junior age groups. He was a Member of Bhutan U19 in the World Cup Qualifying in 2007 in Qatar. He also participated in the U14 AFC U14 Festival in 2003. He is also a member of Bhutan national futsal team.
