= Visa policy of Jordan =

Policy on permits required to enter Jordan

Visitors to Jordan must obtain either a visa on arrival or an e-Visa unless they are citizens from one of the visa-exempt countries. However, certain citizens must obtain either a visa approval through E-Services portal or a visa from one of the Jordanian diplomatic missions.

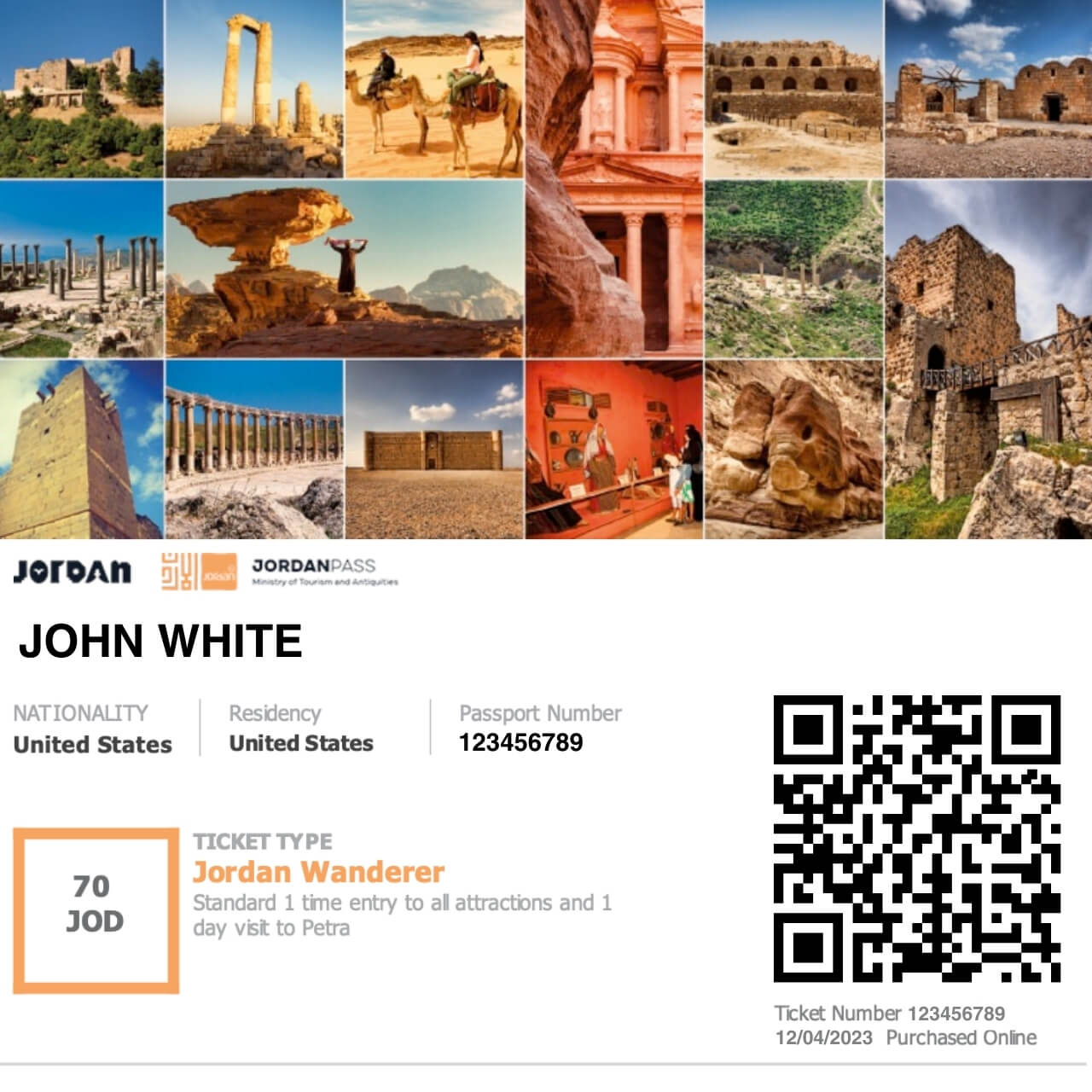
Holders of Jordan Pass are exempt from the visa fee

All visitors must hold a passport valid for at least 6 months beyond the period of intended stay and with two blank pages. Visitors to Jordan must hold a non-refundable return or circle trip tickets except for Government workers continuing to Iraq.

== Visa policy map ==
Visa policy of Jordan Jordan Visa not required (3 months) Visa not required (30 days) Visa not required (14 days) Visa on arrival / eVisa Visa on arrival / eVisa (conditional); otherwise, visa approval required (through E-Services portal) Visa approval required (through E-Services portal) Visa required

== Visa exemption ==
The following citizens do not require a visa to enter, reside, study, and work indefinitely in the Hashemite Kingdom of Jordan without any immigration requirements:

- (Jordan) Jordanian citizens^{1}
- Holders of a travel document issued by Jordan to stateless persons and refugees, including their wife and children with proof thereof.

_{1 - May enter with a Jordanian identity card or an expired Jordanian passport.}

=== Ordinary passports ===
Holders of ordinary passports of the following countries and territories may enter Jordan without a visa for business or tourist purposes for the following period:

3 months within any 6-month period

- Bahrain
- Kuwait
- Lebanon
- Oman
- Qatar
- Saudi Arabia
- Tunisia
- Turkey
- United Arab Emirates

30 days

- Russia^{1}
- Uzbekistan

1 month

- Egypt
- Palestine^{2}

14 days

- Hong Kong

_{1 - No more than 90 days within any 1 calendar year.}
_{2 - Provided that the passport's number does not start with "00".}

- A visa is not required for citizens of Iraq if they travel via Queen Alia International Airport over land to Iraq.
- A visa is not required for citizens of Iraq, Libya, Yemen only if they hold a residence permit issued by any GCC member state, any Schengen Area member state, Australia, Canada, Cyprus, Ireland, Japan, or have a Permanent Resident Card (Green Card) issued by the United States. The residence permit should be valid for at least 6 months and must have a non-refundable round trip tickets.
- A visa is not required for citizens of Syria for the following categories:
  - citizens of Syria if they hold a residence permit issued by the country of departure passing through Jordan on their way to Syria. The residence permit must be valid for a least 4 months from the date of arrival;
  - citizens of Syria who have never visited Jordan and who have a residence permit issued by any GCC member state, any Schengen Area member state, Australia, Canada, Cyprus, Ireland, Japan, South Korea, the United Kingdom, or have a Permanent Resident Card (Green Card) issued by the United States. The residence permit should be valid for at least 6 months and must have a non-refundable round trip tickets;
  - citizens of Syria who have previously been and left Jordan on a regular basis using the Syrian passport with which they entered Jordan and who have a residence permit issued by any GCC member state, any Schengen Area member state, Australia, Canada, Cyprus, Ireland, Japan, South Korea, the United Kingdom, or have a Permanent Resident Card (Green Card) issued by the United States. The residence permit should be valid for at least 4 months and must have a non-refundable round trip tickets;
  - Investors with an investor card (A, B) issued by the Ministry of Investment and their family members with investor family cards;
  - Syrian investors in free economic zones who hold a free economic zone investor card, as well as members of their families with investor family cards;
  - Company owners and investment partners whose shareholding amounts to 50,000 dinars or more, as well as members of their families (spouse, son or daughter), provided that the son or daughter is not married;
  - Syrian sons and husbands of Jordanian women and Jordanian wives.
- A visa is not required for citizens whose family members are citizens of Ukraine residing in Jordan.

=== Non-ordinary passports ===
- Holders of diplomatic passports of any country (except Afghanistan, Bangladesh, Iran, Iraq, Japan, Nigeria, Mexico, Republic of Congo, Serbia, Syria and Yemen) may enter without a visa for up to 3 months within any 6-month period.
- Holders of diplomatic, official or service passports of any GCC member state, any ASEAN member state, Azerbaijan, Bolivia, Bosnia and Herzegovina, Brazil (30 days), Bulgaria, China, Chile (30 days), Croatia, Cyprus, Czech Republic, Djibouti, Egypt, Georgia, Hungary, Kazakhstan (30 days), Lebanon, Peru, Russia, Rwanda, Slovakia, Tunisia, Turkey and United Kingdom may enter Jordan without a visa for up to 3 months within any 6-month period (unless otherwise stated).
- Holders of special passports of China, Egypt, Peru, Russia, Singapore and United Kingdom may enter Jordan without a visa for 3 months within any 6-month period.
- A visa is not required for holders of an 'Investor Card' with category A or B for up to 3 months within any 6-month period.
- A visa is not required for holders of a UN Laissez-Passer issued by the United Nations and their family members but must provide proof that they are holding a security clearance issued by the Jordan Ministry of Interior for up to 3 months within any 6-month period.
- A visa is not required for merchant seamen and crew members of all countries arriving by air in order to board a ship, or if arriving by ship in order to board an aircraft, provided they are holding a Letter of Employment or Letter of Guarantee of the shipping company.
- A visa is not required to enter Jordan for members of the US military or personnel of the Department of Defense (DoD) provided they are holding a US Military ID card (i.e. CAC card) and a travel order.

=== Changes ===
Jordan has signed visa exemption agreements with the following countries, but they have not yet entered into force:

Country	Passports	Agreement signed on
Montenegro	Diplomatic, service	28 October 2026
Azerbaijan	Ordinary	8 July 2026

== Visa on arrival / Electronic visa (e-Visa) ==
Citizens of countries and territories (except for the citizens mentioned below) have the option to obtain either a visa on arrival (90 days for 40 JOD) or an e-Visa.

Visa on arrival is not issued at the Allenby/King Hussein Bridge border crossing. Visitors should apply for a sticker visa, an electronic visa, or a Jordan Pass in advance to enter Jordan at this border crossing.

=== Visa approval required ===
Visa on arrival / e-Visa is not issued to holders of emergency, temporary, or ordinary passports issued by the following countries and territories. These citizens can apply for a visa with an approval through the Jordan Ministry of Interior E-Services:

- Afghanistan^{2}
- Angola^{2 3}
- Bangladesh^{2}
- Belize^{2 3}
- Benin^{2 3}
- Botswana^{2 3}
- Burkina Faso^{2 3}
- Burundi^{2 3}
- Cambodia^{2 3}
- Cameroon^{2 3}
- Central African Republic^{2 3}
- Chad^{1 3}
- Comoros^{2 4}
- Republic of Congo^{2 3}
- DR Congo^{2 3}
- Cote d'Ivoire^{2 3}
- Cuba^{2 3}
- Djibouti^{2 4}
- Equatorial Guinea^{2 3}
- Eritrea^{2 3}
- Ethiopia^{1 3}
- Gabon^{3}
- Gambia^{2 3}
- Ghana^{2 3}
- Guinea^{2 3}
- Guinea-Bissau^{2 3}
- Iraq^{1 4}
- Laos^{2 3}
- Liberia^{2 3}
- Madagascar^{2 3}
- Mali^{2 3}
- Mauritania^{2 4}
- Mongolia^{2 3}
- Mozambique^{2 3}
- Myanmar^{3}
- Namibia^{2 3}
- Nepal^{2 3}
- Niger^{2 3}
- Nigeria^{1}
- Pakistan^{2 3}
- Palestine^{3}
- Papua New Guinea^{2 3}
- Philippines^{2 3}
- Senegal^{2 3}
- Sierra Leone^{2 3}
- Somalia^{2 4}
- Sri Lanka^{2 3}
- Sudan^{1 4}
- Syria^{1}
- Tanzania^{2 3}
- Timor-Leste^{3}
- Togo^{2 3}
- Uganda^{2 3}
- Yemen^{1 4}
- Zambia^{2 3}

_{1 - Visa on arrival if they are males younger than 15 or older than 50 years, or female of all ages and travel for medical treatment. They must have a return/onward ticket and a medical report issued by a Jordanian hospital to prove their need for treatment. They are allowed to be accompanied by a maximum of 4 first-degree family members, in addition to minors. If the number of accompanying family members exceeds the mentioned limit, airlines must obtain OK to Board approval from immigration.}
_{2 - Visa on arrival if they travel with a used medical visa issued by Jordan and travel to continue their treatment.}
_{3 - Visa on arrival / e-Visa for a maximum stay of 2 months only if they have: a permanent residence permit issued by any GCC member state, any Schengen Area member state, Australia, Canada, Cyprus, Ireland, Japan, South Korea, or have a Permanent Resident Card (Green Card) issued by the US; a visa issued by any Schengen Area member state or the United States. The residence permit should be valid for at least 4 months and they must have a non-refundable return or circle trip tickets. The visa should be valid for at least 6 months and must have a non-refundable return or circle trip tickets.}
_{4 - Visa on arrival / e-Visa for a maximum stay of 2 months only if they have: a residence permit issued by a country whose citizens may obtain a visa on arrival; a visa issued by any Schengen Area member state or the United States. The residence permit should be valid for at least 4 months and they must have a non-refundable return or circle trip tickets. The visa should be valid for at least 6 months and must have a non-refundable return or circle trip tickets.}

There are special visa on arrival rules for citizens of the following countries and territories:

- Iraq - Citizens Iraq with a may obtain a visa upon arrival if they have:
  - an official "Businessmen card" issued by Jordan;
  - an official letter for a delegate confirming the attendance to a conference or workshop.
- Morocco - For women between the ages of 17 and 35, prior approval from the Ministry of Home Affairs is required. All other citizens are eligible for a visa on arrival.
- Sri Lanka - Visa on arrival for a maximum stay of 2 months provided traveling on Royal Jordanian Airlines (RJ) and are holding hotel reservation in a 3 to 5 star hotel and an official documents confirming business or official delegate status.
- Yemen - Citizens of Yemen with a residence permit issued by the United Kingdom and a return/onward ticket may obtain a visa upon arrival.

Accompanying staff (housemaids, drivers), traveling with their employer, may obtain a visa on arrival for a maximum stay of 3 months, but this is not applicable for holders of ordinary passports of Myanmar, Syria and Yemen.

Holders of Interpol passports may obtain a visa on arrival, provided they are traveling on duty. In addition, the Interpol office in Amman must be notified before departure.

=== Changes ===
In January 2026, Jordan extended the period of stay for visitors on a visa on arrival or e-Visa from 30 days to 90 days, with no change in visa fees or application procedures.

== Visa required in advance ==
Citizens of the following countries must apply for a visa at a Jordanian embassy or consulate:

- Iran

== Emergency Certificate ==
- Malaysia - Jordan does not recognize the Malaysian Emergency Certificate. Transit inside the Queen Alia Terminal Airport is allowed, but not to go out of the terminal. Malaysians who holding Emergency Certificate require Single Journey Travel from issued country to Malaysia.

== Transit ==
A transit visa is not required if holding a confirmed onward ticket for a flight to a third country within 48 hours.

== Entry at Allenby/King Hussein Bridge Border Crossing ==
Israel - Israeli citizens may not use the Allenby/King Hussein Bridge border crossing.

In practice, citizens of other countries may enter the West Bank via the Allenby/King Hussein Bridge border crossing and return to Jordan through the same crossing without obtaining a new visa, provided their original Jordanian entry authorization remains valid.

== See also ==
- Visa requirements for Jordanian citizens
