= 2019 AFC Asian Cup qualification =

Tournament details
- Dates: 12 March 2015 – 27 March 2018
- Teams: 46 (Note: Kuwait disqualified after playing five matches. Indonesia disqualified before playing. Guam withrew before playing third round. UAE participated to reach the World Cup.) (from 1 confederation)

Tournament statistics
- Matches played: 252
- Goals scored: 820 (3.25 per match)
- Attendance: 3,022,771 (11,995 per match)
- Top scorer: (Saudi Arabia) Mohammad Al-Sahlawi (14 goals)

The 2019 AFC Asian Cup qualification was the qualification process organized by the Asian Football Confederation (AFC) to determine the participating teams for the 2019 AFC Asian Cup, the 17th edition of the international men's football championship of Asia. For the first time, the Asian Cup final tournament was contested by 24 teams, having been expanded from the 16-team format that was used from 2004 to 2015.

The qualification process involved four rounds, where the first two doubled as the 2018 FIFA World Cup qualification for Asian teams.

== Format ==
The qualification structure was as follows:

- First round: A total of twelve teams (teams ranked 35–46) played home-and-away over two legs. The six winners advanced to the second round.
- Second round: A total of forty teams (teams ranked 1–34 and six first round winners) were divided into eight groups of five teams to play home-and-away round-robin matches.
  - The eight group winners and the four best group runners-up including host UAE qualified for the AFC Asian Cup finals and advance to the third round of 2018 FIFA World Cup qualifiers.
  - The next sixteen highest ranked teams (the remaining four group runners-up, the eight third-placed teams and the four best group fourth-placed teams) advanced directly to the third round of Asian Cup qualification.
  - The remaining twelve teams entered the play-off round to contest the remaining eight spots in the third round of Asian Cup qualification.
- Play-off round: At a Competition Committee meeting in November 2014, it was decided that a play-off round of qualifying would be introduced into the qualification procedure. There were two rounds of home-and-away two-legged play-off matches to determine the final eight qualifiers for the third round.
- Third round: The 24 teams were divided into six groups of four to play home-and-away round-robin matches, and they competed for the remaining slots of the 2019 AFC Asian Cup.

The play-off round represented a change from the initially announced qualification format – which saw the remaining fourth-placed teams and the four best group fifth-placed teams also advance to the third round.

== Entrants ==
46 FIFA-affiliated nations from the AFC entered qualification. In order to determine which nations would compete in the first round and which nations would receive a bye through to the second round, the FIFA World Rankings of January 2015 were used (shown in parentheses).

| Bye to second round (Ranked 1st to 34th) | Competing in first round (Ranked 35th to 46th) |
|---|---|
| 1. Iran (51); 2. Japan (54); 3. South Korea (69); 4. Uzbekistan (71); 5. United Arab Emirates (80); 6. Qatar (92); 7. Oman (93); 8. Jordan (93); 9. China (96); 10. Australia (100); 11. Saudi Arabia (102); 12. Bahrain (110); 13. Iraq (114); 14. Palestine (115); 15. Lebanon (122); 16. Kuwait (125); 17. Philippines (129); 18. Maldives (131); 19. Vietnam (133); 20. Tajikistan (136); 21. Myanmar (141); 22. Afghanistan (142); 23. Thailand (144); 24. Turkmenistan (147); 25. North Korea (150); 26. Syria (151); 27. Kyrgyzstan (152); 28. Malaysia (154); 29. Hong Kong (156); 30. Singapore (157); 31. Indonesia (159); 32. Laos (160); 33. Guam (161); 34. Bangladesh (165) | 35. India (171); 36. Sri Lanka (172); 37. Yemen (176); 38. Cambodia (179); 39. Chinese Taipei (182); 40. Timor-Leste (185); 41. Nepal (186); 42. Macau (186); 43. Pakistan (188); 44. Mongolia (194); 45. Brunei (198); 46. Bhutan (209) |

Due to the joint format of the FIFA World Cup qualifiers and AFC Asian Cup qualifiers, the hosts of the 2019 AFC Asian Cup, the United Arab Emirates also entered the second round of AFC Asian Cup qualifiers despite having qualified automatically.

Northern Mariana Islands, which is not a FIFA member, were not eligible to enter.

== Schedule ==
The schedule of the qualification competition was as follows.

| Round | Matchday | Date |
|---|---|---|
| First round | First leg | 12 March 2015 |
| First round | Second leg | 17 March 2015 |
| Second round | Matchday 1 | 11 June 2015 |
| Second round | Matchday 2 | 16 June 2015 |
| Second round | Matchday 3 | 3 September 2015 |
| Second round | Matchday 4 | 8 September 2015 |
| Second round | Matchday 5 | 8 October 2015 |
| Second round | Matchday 6 | 13 October 2015 |
| Second round | Matchday 7 | 12 November 2015 |
| Second round | Matchday 8 | 17 November 2015 |
| Second round | Matchday 9 | 24 March 2016 |
| Second round | Matchday 10 | 29 March 2016 |

| Round | Matchday | Date |
|---|---|---|
| Play-off round | Round 1 First leg | 2 June 2016 |
| Play-off round | Round 1 Second leg | 7 June 2016 |
| Play-off round | Round 2 First leg | 6 September 2016 |
| Play-off round | Round 2 Second leg | 11 October 2016 |
| Third round | Matchday 1 | 28 March 2017 |
| Third round | Matchday 2 | 13 June 2017 |
| Third round | Matchday 3 | 5 September 2017 |
| Third round | Matchday 4 | 10 October 2017 |
| Third round | Matchday 5 | 14 November 2017 |
| Third round | Matchday 6 | 27 March 2018 |

== First round ==
The draw for the first round was held on 10 February 2015, 15:30 MST (UTC+8), at the AFC House in Kuala Lumpur, Malaysia.

The six teams eliminated from this stage progressed to the 2016 AFC Solidarity Cup.

| Team 1 | Agg. | Team 2 | 1st leg | 2nd leg |
|---|---|---|---|---|
| India | 2–0 | Nepal | 2–0 | 0–0 |
| Yemen | 3–1 | Pakistan | 3–1 | 0–0 |
| Timor-Leste | 5–1 (Note: On 12 December 2017, Timor-Leste were ordered by the AFC to forfeit both matches against Mongolia due to the use of falsified documents for their players.) | Mongolia | 4–1 | 1–0 |
| Cambodia | 4–1 | Macau | 3–0 | 1–1 |
| Chinese Taipei | 2–1 | Brunei | 0–1 | 2–0 |
| Sri Lanka | 1–3 | Bhutan | 0–1 | 1–2 |

== Second round ==
The draw for the second round was held on 14 April 2015, 17:00 MST (UTC+8), at the JW Marriott Hotel in Kuala Lumpur, Malaysia.

=== Groups ===
2018 FIFA World Cup qualification tiebreakers
In league format, the ranking of teams in each group was based on the following criteria (regulations Articles 20.6 and 20.7):
1. Points (3 points for a win, 1 point for a draw, 0 points for a loss)
2. Overall goal difference
3. Overall goals scored
4. Points in matches between tied teams
5. Goal difference in matches between tied teams
6. Goals scored in matches between tied teams
7. Away goals scored in matches between tied teams (if the tie was only between two teams in home-and-away league format)
8. Fair play points
  - first yellow card: minus 1 point
  - indirect red card (second yellow card): minus 3 points
  - direct red card: minus 4 points
  - yellow card and direct red card: minus 5 points
9. Drawing of lots by the FIFA Organising Committee

==== Group A ====
| Pos | Team | Pld | W | D | L | GF | GA | GD | Pts | Qualification | Saudi Arabia | United Arab Emirates | Palestine | Malaysia | East Timor |
|---|---|---|---|---|---|---|---|---|---|---|---|---|---|---|---|
| 1 | Saudi Arabia | 8 | 6 | 2 | 0 | 28 | 4 | +24 | 20 | World Cup qualifying third round and Asian Cup | — | 2–1 | 3–2 | 2–0 | 7–0 (Note: On 12 December 2017, AFC decided to forfeit the first five matches involving Timor-Leste – both v Malaysia, home v United Arab Emirates, away v Saudi Arabia, and home v Palestine due to the use of falsified documents for their players of Timor-Leste.) |
| 2 | United Arab Emirates (Note: United Arab Emirates already qualified for the Asian Cup as the host nation.) | 8 | 5 | 2 | 1 | 27 | 4 | +23 | 17 | World Cup qualifying third round | 1–1 | — | 2–0 | 10–0 | 8–0 |
| 3 | Palestine | 8 | 4 | 2 | 2 | 24 | 5 | +19 | 14 | Asian Cup qualifying third round | 0–0 | 0–0 | — | 6–0 | 7–0 |
| 4 | Malaysia | 8 | 2 | 0 | 6 | 7 | 29 | −22 | 6 | Asian Cup qualifying play-off round | 0–3 (Note: Match abandoned after 87 minutes due to a group of supporters throwing flares at the pitch. A month later, FIFA awarded Saudi Arabia 3–0 win.) | 1–2 | 0–6 | — | 1–1 |
| 5 | Timor-Leste | 8 | 0 | 0 | 8 | 0 | 44 | −44 | 0 | Asian Cup qualifying play-off round | 0–10 | 0–1 | 1–1 | 0–1 | — |

==== Group B ====
| Pos | Team | Pld | W | D | L | GF | GA | GD | Pts | Qualification | Australia | Jordan | Kyrgyzstan | Tajikistan | Bangladesh |
|---|---|---|---|---|---|---|---|---|---|---|---|---|---|---|---|
| 1 | Australia | 8 | 7 | 0 | 1 | 29 | 4 | +25 | 21 | World Cup qualifying third round and Asian Cup | — | 5–1 | 3–0 | 7–0 | 5–0 |
| 2 | Jordan | 8 | 5 | 1 | 2 | 21 | 7 | +14 | 16 | Asian Cup qualifying third round | 2–0 | — | 0–0 | 3–0 | 8–0 |
| 3 | Kyrgyzstan | 8 | 4 | 2 | 2 | 10 | 8 | +2 | 14 | Asian Cup qualifying third round | 1–2 | 1–0 | — | 2–2 | 2–0 |
| 4 | Tajikistan | 8 | 1 | 2 | 5 | 9 | 20 | −11 | 5 | Asian Cup qualifying play-off round | 0–3 | 1–3 | 0–1 | — | 5–0 |
| 5 | Bangladesh | 8 | 0 | 1 | 7 | 2 | 32 | −30 | 1 | Asian Cup qualifying play-off round | 0–4 | 0–4 | 1–3 | 1–1 | — |

==== Group C ====
| Pos | Team | Pld | W | D | L | GF | GA | GD | Pts | Qualification | Qatar | People's Republic of China | Hong Kong | Maldives | Bhutan |
|---|---|---|---|---|---|---|---|---|---|---|---|---|---|---|---|
| 1 | Qatar | 8 | 7 | 0 | 1 | 29 | 4 | +25 | 21 | World Cup qualifying third round and Asian Cup | — | 1–0 | 2–0 | 4–0 | 15–0 |
| 2 | China | 8 | 5 | 2 | 1 | 27 | 1 | +26 | 17 | World Cup qualifying third round and Asian Cup | 2–0 | — | 0–0 | 4–0 | 12–0 |
| 3 | Hong Kong | 8 | 4 | 2 | 2 | 13 | 5 | +8 | 14 | Asian Cup qualifying third round | 2–3 | 0–0 | — | 2–0 | 7–0 |
| 4 | Maldives | 8 | 2 | 0 | 6 | 8 | 20 | −12 | 6 | Asian Cup qualifying play-off round | 0–1 | 0–3 | 0–1 | — | 4–2 |
| 5 | Bhutan | 8 | 0 | 0 | 8 | 5 | 52 | −47 | 0 | Asian Cup qualifying play-off round | 0–3 | 0–6 | 0–1 | 3–4 | — |

==== Group D ====
| Pos | Team | Pld | W | D | L | GF | GA | GD | Pts | Qualification | Iran | Oman | Turkmenistan | Guam | India |
|---|---|---|---|---|---|---|---|---|---|---|---|---|---|---|---|
| 1 | Iran | 8 | 6 | 2 | 0 | 26 | 3 | +23 | 20 | World Cup qualifying third round and Asian Cup | — | 2–0 | 3–1 | 6–0 | 4–0 |
| 2 | Oman | 8 | 4 | 2 | 2 | 11 | 7 | +4 | 14 | Asian Cup qualifying third round | 1–1 | — | 3–1 | 1–0 | 3–0 |
| 3 | Turkmenistan | 8 | 4 | 1 | 3 | 10 | 11 | −1 | 13 | Asian Cup qualifying third round | 1–1 | 2–1 | — | 1–0 | 2–1 |
| 4 | Guam | 8 | 2 | 1 | 5 | 3 | 16 | −13 | 7 | Asian Cup qualifying third round | 0–6 | 0–0 | 1–0 | — | 2–1 |
| 5 | India | 8 | 1 | 0 | 7 | 5 | 18 | −13 | 3 | Asian Cup qualifying play-off round | 0–3 (Note: FIFA awarded Iran a 3–0 win as a result of India fielding the ineligible player Eugeneson Lyngdoh. The match initially ended 3–0 to Iran.) | 1–2 | 1–2 | 1–0 | — |

==== Group E ====
| Pos | Team | Pld | W | D | L | GF | GA | GD | Pts | Qualification | Japan | United Arab Republic | Singapore | Afghanistan | Cambodia |
|---|---|---|---|---|---|---|---|---|---|---|---|---|---|---|---|
| 1 | Japan | 8 | 7 | 1 | 0 | 27 | 0 | +27 | 22 | World Cup qualifying third round and Asian Cup | — | 5–0 | 0–0 | 5–0 | 3–0 |
| 2 | Syria | 8 | 6 | 0 | 2 | 26 | 11 | +15 | 18 | World Cup qualifying third round and Asian Cup | 0–3 | — | 1–0 | 5–2 | 6–0 |
| 3 | Singapore | 8 | 3 | 1 | 4 | 9 | 9 | 0 | 10 | Asian Cup qualifying third round | 0–3 | 1–2 | — | 1–0 | 2–1 |
| 4 | Afghanistan | 8 | 3 | 0 | 5 | 8 | 24 | −16 | 9 | Asian Cup qualifying third round | 0–6 | 0–6 | 2–1 | — | 3–0 |
| 5 | Cambodia | 8 | 0 | 0 | 8 | 1 | 27 | −26 | 0 | Asian Cup qualifying play-off round | 0–2 | 0–6 | 0–4 | 0–1 | — |

==== Group F ====
Indonesia was also drawn into this group, but on 30 May 2015 the country's football association was suspended due to governmental interference, and on 3 June 2015 the team was disqualified and all matches involving it were cancelled.

| Pos | Team | Pld | W | D | L | GF | GA | GD | Pts | Qualification | Thailand | Iraq | Vietnam | Chinese Taipei for Olympic games | Indonesia |
|---|---|---|---|---|---|---|---|---|---|---|---|---|---|---|---|
| 1 | Thailand | 6 | 4 | 2 | 0 | 14 | 6 | +8 | 14 | World Cup qualifying third round and Asian Cup | — | 2–2 | 1–0 | 4–2 | Canc. |
| 2 | Iraq | 6 | 3 | 3 | 0 | 13 | 6 | +7 | 12 | World Cup qualifying third round and Asian Cup | 2–2 | — | 1–0 | 5–1 | Canc. |
| 3 | Vietnam | 6 | 2 | 1 | 3 | 7 | 8 | −1 | 7 | Asian Cup qualifying third round | 0–3 | 1–1 | — | 4–1 | Canc. |
| 4 | Chinese Taipei | 6 | 0 | 0 | 6 | 5 | 19 | −14 | 0 | Asian Cup qualifying play-off round | 0–2 | 0–2 | 1–2 | — | Canc. |
| 5 | Indonesia (Note: Indonesia was also drawn into this group, but on 30 May 2015 the country's football association was suspended due to governmental interference, and on 3 June 2015 the team was disqualified and all matches involving it were cancelled.) | 0 | 0 | 0 | 0 | 0 | 0 | 0 | 0 | Disqualified | Canc. | Canc. | Canc. | Canc. | — |

==== Group G ====
| Pos | Team | Pld | W | D | L | GF | GA | GD | Pts | Qualification | South Korea | Lebanon | Kuwait | Myanmar | Laos |
|---|---|---|---|---|---|---|---|---|---|---|---|---|---|---|---|
| 1 | South Korea | 8 | 8 | 0 | 0 | 27 | 0 | +27 | 24 | World Cup qualifying third round and Asian Cup | — | 1–0 | 3–0 (Note: During this stage the Kuwait Football Association was suspended after the country had failed to comply with a decision from FIFA that its sports law had to be changed. The three remaining matches involving Kuwait – away v Myanmar, home v Laos, and away v South Korea – were not played as scheduled, and were eventually awarded as 3–0 wins for Kuwait's opponents. Kuwait was also unable to compete in the Third round of the Asian Cup qualifying, to which it would have advanced based on its ranking.) | 4–0 | 8–0 |
| 2 | Lebanon | 8 | 3 | 2 | 3 | 12 | 6 | +6 | 11 | Asian Cup qualifying third round | 0–3 | — | 0–1 | 1–1 | 7–0 |
| 3 | Kuwait | 8 | 3 | 1 | 4 | 12 | 10 | +2 | 10 | Disqualified | 0–1 | 0–0 | — | 9–0 | 0–3 |
| 4 | Myanmar | 8 | 2 | 2 | 4 | 9 | 21 | −12 | 8 | Asian Cup qualifying third round | 0–2 | 0–2 | 3–0 | — | 3–1 |
| 5 | Laos | 8 | 1 | 1 | 6 | 6 | 29 | −23 | 4 | Asian Cup qualifying play-off round | 0–5 | 0–2 | 0–2 | 2–2 | — |

==== Group H ====
| Pos | Team | Pld | W | D | L | GF | GA | GD | Pts | Qualification | Uzbekistan | North Korea | Philippines | Bahrain | Yemen |
|---|---|---|---|---|---|---|---|---|---|---|---|---|---|---|---|
| 1 | Uzbekistan | 8 | 7 | 0 | 1 | 20 | 7 | +13 | 21 | World Cup qualifying third round and Asian Cup | — | 3–1 | 1–0 | 1–0 | 1–0 |
| 2 | North Korea | 8 | 5 | 1 | 2 | 14 | 8 | +6 | 16 | Asian Cup qualifying third round | 4–2 | — | 0–0 | 2–0 | 1–0 |
| 3 | Philippines | 8 | 3 | 1 | 4 | 8 | 12 | −4 | 10 | Asian Cup qualifying third round | 1–5 | 3–2 | — | 2–1 | 0–1 |
| 4 | Bahrain | 8 | 3 | 0 | 5 | 10 | 10 | 0 | 9 | Asian Cup qualifying third round | 0–4 | 0–1 | 2–0 | — | 3–0 |
| 5 | Yemen | 8 | 1 | 0 | 7 | 2 | 17 | −15 | 3 | Asian Cup qualifying play-off round | 1–3 | 0–3 (Note: FIFA awarded North Korea a 3–0 win as a result of Yemen fielding the ineligible player Mudir Al-Radaei, after North Korea had defeated Yemen 1–0. Al-Radaei failed to serve an automatic one match suspension for receiving two yellow cards earlier in the First round of the competition.) | 0–2 | 0–4 | — |

=== Ranking of runner-up teams ===
To determine the four best runner-up teams, the following criteria are used:

1. Points (3 points for a win, 1 point for a draw, 0 points for a loss)
2. Goal difference
3. Goals scored
4. Fair play points
5. Drawing of lots

As a result of Indonesia being disqualified due to FIFA suspension, Group F contained only four teams compared to five teams in all other groups. Therefore, the results against the fifth-placed team were not counted when determining the ranking of the runner-up teams.

| Pos | Grp | Team | Pld | W | D | L | GF | GA | GD | Pts | Qualification |
|---|---|---|---|---|---|---|---|---|---|---|---|
| 1 | F | Iraq | 6 | 3 | 3 | 0 | 13 | 6 | +7 | 12 | World Cup qualifying third round and Asian Cup |
| 2 | E | Syria | 6 | 4 | 0 | 2 | 14 | 11 | +3 | 12 | World Cup qualifying third round and Asian Cup |
| 3 | A | United Arab Emirates (Note: United Arab Emirates already qualified for the Asian Cup as the host nation.) | 6 | 3 | 2 | 1 | 16 | 4 | +12 | 11 | World Cup qualifying third round |
| 4 | C | China | 6 | 3 | 2 | 1 | 9 | 1 | +8 | 11 | World Cup qualifying third round and Asian Cup |
| 5 | H | North Korea | 6 | 3 | 1 | 2 | 10 | 8 | +2 | 10 | Asian Cup qualifying third round |
| 6 | B | Jordan | 6 | 3 | 1 | 2 | 9 | 7 | +2 | 10 | Asian Cup qualifying third round |
| 7 | D | Oman | 6 | 2 | 2 | 2 | 6 | 6 | 0 | 8 | Asian Cup qualifying third round |
| 8 | G | Lebanon | 6 | 1 | 2 | 3 | 3 | 6 | −3 | 5 | Asian Cup qualifying third round |

Source: FIFA
Rules for classification: Counting only matches against teams ranked first to fourth in the group, 1) Points; 2) Goal difference; 3) Goals scored; 4) Fair play points; 5) Drawing of lots.

=== Ranking of fourth-placed teams ===
To determine the four best fourth-placed teams, the following criteria were used:

1. Points (3 points for a win, 1 point for a draw, 0 points for a loss)
2. Goal difference
3. Goals scored
4. Fair play points
5. Drawing of lots

As a result of Indonesia being disqualified due to FIFA suspension, Group F contained only four teams compared to five teams in all other groups. Therefore, the results against the fifth-placed team are not counted when determining the ranking of the fourth-placed teams.

| Pos | Grp | Team | Pld | W | D | L | GF | GA | GD | Pts | Qualification |
|---|---|---|---|---|---|---|---|---|---|---|---|
| 1 | D | Guam | 6 | 1 | 1 | 4 | 1 | 14 | −13 | 4 | Asian Cup qualifying third round |
| 2 | G | Myanmar | 6 | 1 | 1 | 4 | 4 | 18 | −14 | 4 | Asian Cup qualifying third round |
| 3 | H | Bahrain | 6 | 1 | 0 | 5 | 3 | 10 | −7 | 3 | Asian Cup qualifying third round |
| 4 | E | Afghanistan | 6 | 1 | 0 | 5 | 4 | 24 | −20 | 3 | Asian Cup qualifying third round |
| 5 | B | Tajikistan | 6 | 0 | 1 | 5 | 3 | 19 | −16 | 1 | Asian Cup qualifying play-off round |
| 6 | F | Chinese Taipei | 6 | 0 | 0 | 6 | 5 | 19 | −14 | 0 | Asian Cup qualifying play-off round |
| 7 | C | Maldives | 6 | 0 | 0 | 6 | 0 | 15 | −15 | 0 | Asian Cup qualifying play-off round |
| 8 | A | Malaysia | 6 | 0 | 0 | 6 | 1 | 29 | −28 | 0 | Asian Cup qualifying play-off round |

Source: FIFA
Rules for classification: Counting only matches against teams ranked first to fourth in the group, 1) Points; 2) Goal difference; 3) Goals scored; 4) Fair play points; 5) Drawing of lots.

== Play-off round ==
At an AFC Competition Committee meeting in November 2014, it was decided that two rounds of play-off matches would be introduced into the qualification procedure to determine the final eight teams for the main qualifying round.

A total of eight slots for the third round were available from this round (five from round 1, three from round 2). The three teams eliminated from this stage progressed to the 2016 AFC Solidarity Cup.

The draw for the play-off round was held on 7 April 2016, 15:00 MYT (UTC+8), at the AFC House in Kuala Lumpur, Malaysia.

=== Round 1 ===
The lowest seeded team, Bhutan, received a bye, and the remaining ten teams were drawn into five pairs. Each pair played two home-and-away matches, with the winners qualifying for the third round.

| Team 1 | Agg. | Team 2 | 1st leg | 2nd leg |
|---|---|---|---|---|
| Chinese Taipei | 2–4 | Cambodia | 2–2 | 0–2 |
| Maldives | 0–4 | Yemen | 0–2 | 0–2 |
| Tajikistan | 6–0 | Bangladesh | 5–0 | 1–0 |
| Malaysia | 6–0 | Timor-Leste | 3–0 (Forfeited) | 3–0 (Forfeited) |
| Laos | 1–7 | India | 0–1 | 1–6 |

Note: Timor-Leste were ordered by the AFC to forfeit both matches against Malaysia due to the use of falsified documents for their players. Both matches originally ended as 3–0 wins to Malaysia.

=== Round 2 ===
The five losers from round 1 joined Bhutan in this round. The six teams were drawn into three pairs. Each pair played two home-and-away matches, with the winners qualifying for the third round.

| Team 1 | Agg. | Team 2 | 1st leg | 2nd leg |
|---|---|---|---|---|
| Maldives | 5–1 | Laos | 4–0 | 1–1 |
| Bangladesh | 1–3 | Bhutan | 0–0 | 1–3 |
| Timor-Leste | 2–4 | Chinese Taipei | 1–2 | 1–2 |

== Third round ==
A total of 24 teams competed in the third round of AFC Asian Cup qualifiers. Since the 2019 hosts United Arab Emirates advanced to the third round of the 2018 FIFA World Cup qualifiers, the automatic slot for the hosts was no longer necessary, and a total of 12 slots for the AFC Asian Cup were available from this round.

Due to the withdrawal of Guam and the suspension of Kuwait, the AFC decided to invite both Nepal and Macau, the top two teams of the 2016 AFC Solidarity Cup, to re-enter 2019 AFC Asian Cup qualification as replacements in order to maintain 24 teams in the third round of the competition.

The draw for the third round was held on 23 January 2017, 16:00 GST, in Abu Dhabi, United Arab Emirates. The 24 teams were drawn into six groups of four.

=== Groups ===
2019 AFC Asian Cup qualification tiebreakers
The teams were ranked according to points (3 points for a win, 1 point for a draw, 0 points for a loss). If tied on points, tiebreakers were applied in the following order (Regulations Article 9.3):
1. Points in head-to-head matches among tied teams;
2. Goal difference in head-to-head matches among tied teams;
3. Goals scored in head-to-head matches among tied teams;
4. Away goals scored in head-to-head matches among tied teams;
5. If more than two teams were tied, and after applying criteria 1 to 4, a subset of teams were still tied, criteria 1 to 4 were reapplied exclusively to this subset of teams;
6. Goal difference in all group matches;
7. Goals scored in all group matches;
8. Penalty shoot-out if only two teams were tied and they met in the last round of the group;
9. Disciplinary points (yellow card = 1 point, red card as a result of two yellow cards = 3 points, direct red card = 3 points, yellow card followed by direct red card = 4 points);
10. Drawing of lots.

==== Group A ====
| Pos | Team | Pld | W | D | L | GF | GA | GD | Pts | Qualification | India | Kyrgyzstan | Myanmar | Macau |
|---|---|---|---|---|---|---|---|---|---|---|---|---|---|---|
| 1 | India | 6 | 4 | 1 | 1 | 11 | 5 | +6 | 13 (Note: Head-to-head results: India 1–0 Kyrgyzstan, Kyrgyzstan 2–1 India (India are ahead of Kyrgyzstan on head to head away goals).) | 2019 AFC Asian Cup | — | 1–0 | 2–2 | 4–1 |
| 2 | Kyrgyzstan | 6 | 4 | 1 | 1 | 14 | 8 | +6 | 13 | 2019 AFC Asian Cup | 2–1 | — | 5–1 | 1–0 |
| 3 | Myanmar | 6 | 2 | 2 | 2 | 10 | 10 | 0 | 8 | | 0–1 | 2–2 | — | 1–0 |
| 4 | Macau | 6 | 0 | 0 | 6 | 4 | 16 | −12 | 0 | | 0–2 | 3–4 | 0–4 | — |

Source: AFC

==== Group B ====
| Pos | Team | Pld | W | D | L | GF | GA | GD | Pts | Qualification | Lebanon | North Korea | Hong Kong | Malaysia |
|---|---|---|---|---|---|---|---|---|---|---|---|---|---|---|
| 1 | Lebanon | 6 | 5 | 1 | 0 | 14 | 4 | +10 | 16 | 2019 AFC Asian Cup | — | 5–0 | 2–0 | 2–1 |
| 2 | North Korea | 6 | 3 | 2 | 1 | 13 | 10 | +3 | 11 | 2019 AFC Asian Cup | 2–2 | — | 2–0 | 4–1 |
| 3 | Hong Kong | 6 | 1 | 2 | 3 | 4 | 7 | −3 | 5 | | 0–1 | 1–1 | — | 2–0 |
| 4 | Malaysia | 6 | 0 | 1 | 5 | 5 | 15 | −10 | 1 | | 1–2 | 1–4 | 1–1 | — |

Source: AFC

==== Group C ====
| Pos | Team | Pld | W | D | L | GF | GA | GD | Pts | Qualification | Jordan | Vietnam | Afghanistan | Cambodia |
|---|---|---|---|---|---|---|---|---|---|---|---|---|---|---|
| 1 | Jordan | 6 | 3 | 3 | 0 | 16 | 5 | +11 | 12 | 2019 AFC Asian Cup | — | 1–1 | 4–1 | 7–0 |
| 2 | Vietnam | 6 | 2 | 4 | 0 | 9 | 3 | +6 | 10 | 2019 AFC Asian Cup | 0–0 | — | 0–0 | 5–0 |
| 3 | Afghanistan | 6 | 1 | 3 | 2 | 7 | 10 | −3 | 6 | | 3–3 | 1–1 | — | 2–1 |
| 4 | Cambodia | 6 | 1 | 0 | 5 | 3 | 17 | −14 | 3 | | 0–1 | 1–2 | 1–0 | — |

Source: AFC

==== Group D ====
| Pos | Team | Pld | W | D | L | GF | GA | GD | Pts | Qualification | Oman | Palestine | Maldives | Bhutan |
|---|---|---|---|---|---|---|---|---|---|---|---|---|---|---|
| 1 | Oman | 6 | 5 | 0 | 1 | 28 | 5 | +23 | 15 (Note: Head-to-head results: Palestine 2–1 Oman, Oman 1–0 Palestine (Oman are ahead of Palestine on away goals).) | 2019 AFC Asian Cup | — | 1–0 | 5–0 | 14–0 |
| 2 | Palestine | 6 | 5 | 0 | 1 | 25 | 3 | +22 | 15 | 2019 AFC Asian Cup | 2–1 | — | 8–1 | 10–0 |
| 3 | Maldives | 6 | 2 | 0 | 4 | 11 | 19 | −8 | 6 | | 1–3 | 0–3 | — | 7–0 |
| 4 | Bhutan | 6 | 0 | 0 | 6 | 2 | 39 | −37 | 0 | | 2–4 | 0–2 | 0–2 | — |

Source: AFC

==== Group E ====
| Pos | Team | Pld | W | D | L | GF | GA | GD | Pts | Qualification | Bahrain | Turkmenistan | Chinese Taipei for Olympic games | Singapore |
|---|---|---|---|---|---|---|---|---|---|---|---|---|---|---|
| 1 | Bahrain | 6 | 4 | 1 | 1 | 15 | 3 | +12 | 13 | 2019 AFC Asian Cup | — | 4–0 | 5–0 | 0–0 |
| 2 | Turkmenistan | 6 | 3 | 1 | 2 | 9 | 10 | −1 | 10 | 2019 AFC Asian Cup | 1–2 | — | 2–1 | 2–1 |
| 3 | Chinese Taipei | 6 | 3 | 0 | 3 | 7 | 12 | −5 | 9 | | 2–1 | 1–3 | — | 1–0 |
| 4 | Singapore | 6 | 0 | 2 | 4 | 3 | 9 | −6 | 2 | | 0–3 | 1–1 | 1–2 | — |

Source: AFC

==== Group F ====
| Pos | Team | Pld | W | D | L | GF | GA | GD | Pts | Qualification | Philippines | Yemen | Tajikistan | Nepal |
|---|---|---|---|---|---|---|---|---|---|---|---|---|---|---|
| 1 | Philippines | 6 | 3 | 3 | 0 | 13 | 8 | +5 | 12 | 2019 AFC Asian Cup | — | 2–2 | 2–1 | 4–1 |
| 2 | Yemen | 6 | 2 | 4 | 0 | 7 | 5 | +2 | 10 | 2019 AFC Asian Cup | 1–1 | — | 2–1 | 2–1 |
| 3 | Tajikistan | 6 | 2 | 1 | 3 | 10 | 9 | +1 | 7 | | 3–4 | 0–0 | — | 3–0 |
| 4 | Nepal | 6 | 0 | 2 | 4 | 3 | 11 | −8 | 2 | | 0–0 | 0–0 | 1–2 | — |

Source: AFC

== Qualified teams ==
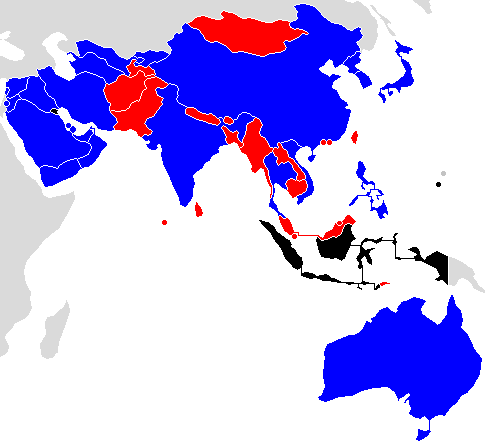
Qualification status Country qualified for Asian Cup Country failed to qualify Country disqualified or withdrew

The following 24 teams qualified for the final tournament.

| Team | Qualified as | Qualified on | Previous appearances in AFC Asian Cup^{1} |
|---|---|---|---|
| United Arab Emirates | Hosts | 9 March 2015 | 9 (1980, 1984, 1988, 1992, 1996, 2004, 2007, 2011, 2015) |
| Saudi Arabia | Second round Group A winners | 24 March 2016 | 9 (**1984**, **1988**, 1992, **1996**, 2000, 2004, 2007, 2011, 2015) |
| Australia | Second round Group B winners | 29 March 2016 | 3 (2007, 2011, **2015**) |
| Qatar | Second round Group C winners | 17 November 2015 | 9 (1980, 1984, 1988, 1992, 2000, 2004, 2007, 2011, 2015) |
| Iran | Second round Group D winners | 29 March 2016 | 13 (**1968**, **1972**, **1976**, 1980, 1984, 1988, 1992, 1996, 2000, 2004, 2007, 2011, 2015) |
| Japan | Second round Group E winners | 24 March 2016 | 8 (1988, **1992**, 1996, **2000**, **2004**, 2007, **2011**, 2015) |
| Thailand | Second round Group F winners | 24 March 2016 | 6 (1972, 1992, 1996, 2000, 2004, 2007) |
| South Korea | Second round Group G winners | 13 January 2016 | 13 (**1956**, **1960**, 1964, 1972, 1980, 1984, 1988, 1996, 2000, 2004, 2007, 2011, 2015) |
| Uzbekistan | Second round Group H winners | 29 March 2016 | 6 (1996, 2000, 2004, 2007, 2011, 2015) |
| Iraq | Second round Group F runners-up | 29 March 2016 | 8 (1972, 1976, 1996, 2000, 2004, **2007**, 2011, 2015) |
| Syria | Second round Group E runners-up | 29 March 2016 | 5 (1980, 1984, 1988, 1996, 2011) |
| China | Second round Group C runners-up | 29 March 2016 | 11 (1976, 1980, 1984, 1988, 1992, 1996, 2000, 2004, 2007, 2011, 2015) |
| India | Third round Group A winners | 11 October 2017 | 3 (1964, 1984, 2011) |
| Kyrgyzstan | Third round Group A runners-up | 22 March 2018 | 0 (debut) |
| Lebanon | Third round Group B winners | 10 November 2017 | 1 (2000) |
| North Korea | Third round Group B runners-up | 27 March 2018 | 4 (1980, 1992, 2011, 2015) |
| Jordan | Third round Group C winners | 14 November 2017 | 3 (2004, 2011, 2015) |
| Vietnam | Third round Group C runners-up | 14 November 2017 | 3 (1956^{2}, 1960^{2}, 2007) |
| Palestine | Third round Group D runners-up | 10 October 2017 | 1 (2015) |
| Oman | Third round Group D winners | 10 October 2017 | 3 (2004, 2007, 2015) |
| Bahrain | Third round Group E winners | 14 November 2017 | 5 (1988, 2004, 2007, 2011, 2015) |
| Turkmenistan | Third round Group E runners-up | 14 November 2017 | 1 (2004) |
| Philippines | Third round Group F winners | 27 March 2018 | 0 (debut) |
| Yemen^{3} | Third round Group F runners-up | 27 March 2018 | 0 (debut)^{3} |

Notes:

^{1} Bold indicates champion for that year. Italic indicates host for that year.
^{2} As South Vietnam
^{3} Yemen once qualified for the 1976 AFC Asian Cup as South Yemen, but according to FIFA and the AFC, the previous records of Yemen are registered as North Yemen instead.

== Goalscorers ==
14 goals

- (Saudi Arabia) Mohammad Al-Sahlawi

11 goals

- (United Arab Emirates) Ahmed Khalil

10 goals

- (Jordan) Hamza Al-Dardour
- (Kyrgyzstan) Anton Zemlianukhin

9 goals

- (Tajikistan) Manuchekhr Dzhalilov

8 goals

- (Australia) Tim Cahill
- (China) Yang Xu
- (India) Sunil Chhetri
- (Oman) Khalid Al-Hajri
- (Oman) Abdulaziz Al-Muqbali

7 goals

- (Bhutan) Chencho Gyeltshen
- (India) Jeje Lalpekhlua
- (Iran) Sardar Azmoun
- (Lebanon) Hassan Maatouk
- (Maldives) Ali Ashfaq
- (Palestine) Jonathan Cantillana
- (Palestine) Sameh Maraaba
- (Syria) Omar Khribin

6 goals

- (China) Yu Dabao
- (Japan) Keisuke Honda
- (Maldives) Naiz Hassan
- (North Korea) Kim Yu-song
- (South Korea) Son Heung-min

5 goals

- (Australia) Tom Rogic
- (Chinese Taipei) Chen Po-liang
- (Iran) Mehdi Taremi
- (Japan) Shinji Kagawa
- (Jordan) Hassan Abdel-Fattah
- (Myanmar) Kyaw Ko Ko
- (North Korea) Jong Il-gwan
- (North Korea) Pak Kwang-ryong
- (Oman) Ahmed Mubarak Al-Mahaijri
- (Philippines) Phil Younghusband
- (Palestine) Abdelatif Bahdari
- (Palestine) Ahmad Abu Nahyeh
- (Qatar) Hassan Al-Haidos
- (Saudi Arabia) Taisir Al-Jassim
- (United Arab Emirates) Ali Mabkhout
- (Uzbekistan) Sardor Rashidov
- (Yemen) Abdulwasea Al-Matari

4 goals

- (Australia) Mile Jedinak
- (Bahrain) Mahdi Abduljabbar
- (Chinese Taipei) Wu Chun-ching
- (Iraq) Younis Mahmoud
- (Japan) Shinji Okazaki
- (Jordan) Munther Abu Amarah
- (Jordan) Abdallah Deeb
- (Kuwait) Bader Al-Mutawa
- (Kuwait) Yousef Nasser
- (Kyrgyzstan) Vitalij Lux
- (Palestine) Yashir Pinto
- (Palestine) Tamer Seyam
- (Philippines) Javier Patiño
- (Qatar) Boualem Khoukhi
- (Qatar) Mohammed Muntari
- (Qatar) Mohammed Musa
- (Syria) Osama Omari
- (Tajikistan) Akhtam Nazarov
- (Tajikistan) Parvizdzhon Umarbayev
- (Uzbekistan) Igor Sergeev

3 goals

- (Afghanistan) Khaibar Amani
- (Australia) Nathan Burns
- (Bahrain) Ismail Abdullatif
- (Bahrain) Abdulla Yusuf Helal
- (Bhutan) Tshering Dorji
- (Cambodia) Chan Vathanaka
- (China) Jiang Ning
- (Hong Kong) Jaimes McKee
- (Japan) Maya Yoshida
- (Jordan) Yaseen Al-Bakhit
- (Jordan) Odai Al-Saify
- (Laos) Khampheng Sayavutthi
- (Lebanon) Rabih Ataya
- (Lebanon) Hilal El-Helwe
- (Malaysia) Ahmad Hazwan Bakri
- (Maldives) Ali Fasir
- (Myanmar) Aung Thu
- (North Korea) Ri Hyok-chol
- (Philippines) Misagh Bahadoran
- (Philippines) Iain Ramsay
- (Qatar) Ali Assadalla
- (Saudi Arabia) Yahya Al-Shehri
- (Singapore) Safuwan Baharudin
- (Singapore) Fazrul Nawaz
- (South Korea) Kwon Chang-hoon
- (South Korea) Lee Jae-sung
- (Syria) Sanharib Malki
- (Syria) Mahmoud Maowas
- (Thailand) Teerasil Dangda
- (Turkmenistan) Arslanmyrat Amanow
- (Turkmenistan) Altymyrat Annadurdyýew
- (United Arab Emirates) Omar Abdulrahman
- (Uzbekistan) Odil Ahmedov
- (Vietnam) Lê Công Vinh
- (Vietnam) Nguyễn Văn Toàn

2 goals

- (Afghanistan) Norlla Amiri
- (Afghanistan) Jabar Sharza
- (Afghanistan) Mustafa Zazai
- (Australia) Massimo Luongo
- (Australia) Mark Milligan
- (Australia) Aaron Mooy
- (Bahrain) Abdulwahab Al-Malood
- (Bahrain) Mohamed Al Romaihi
- (Bahrain) Sayed Mohamed Adnan
- (Bahrain) Abdulla Yaser
- (Cambodia) Khoun Laboravy
- (Cambodia) Prak Mony Udom
- (China) Wang Yongpo
- (China) Wu Lei
- (China) Yu Hanchao
- (Chinese Taipei) Chu En-le
- (Hong Kong) Godfred Karikari
- (Hong Kong) Lam Ka Wai
- (India) Sandesh Jhingan
- (India) Balwant Singh
- (Iran) Ashkan Dejagah
- (Iran) Ehsan Hajsafi
- (Iraq) Ali Adnan
- (Iraq) Justin Meram
- (Japan) Mu Kanazaki
- (Jordan) Ahmed Samir
- (Kyrgyzstan) Mirlan Murzaev
- (Laos) Khonesavanh Sihavong
- (Lebanon) Hassan Chaito
- (Lebanon) Mohammed Ghaddar
- (Lebanon) Ali Hamam
- (Macau) Niki Torrão
- (Malaysia) Mohd Amri Yahyah
- (Malaysia) Safawi Rasid
- (Maldives) Ahmed Nashid
- (Myanmar) Sithu Aung
- (Oman) Sami Al-Hasani
- (Oman) Amad Al-Hosni
- (Oman) Mohsin Al-Khaldi
- (Oman) Raed Ibrahim Saleh
- (Palestine) Jaka Ihbeisheh
- (Palestine) Ahmad Maher Wridat
- (Palestine) Mahmoud Yousef
- (Qatar) Karim Boudiaf
- (Qatar) Mohammed Kasola
- (Saudi Arabia) Fahad Al-Muwallad
- (Singapore) Khairul Amri
- (South Korea) Jang Hyun-soo
- (South Korea) Ki Sung-yueng
- (South Korea) Koo Ja-cheol
- (South Korea) Suk Hyun-jun
- (Syria) Abdelrazaq Al Hussain
- (Syria) Raja Rafe
- (Tajikistan) Jahongir Ergashev
- (Tajikistan) Dilshod Vasiev
- (Thailand) Pokklaw Anan
- (Thailand) Theerathon Bunmathan
- (Thailand) Adisak Kraisorn
- (Thailand) Mongkol Tossakrai
- (Timor-Leste) Chiquito do Carmo
- (Timor-Leste) Ramon Saro
- (Turkmenistan) Guwanç Abylow
- (Turkmenistan) Ruslan Mingazow
- (Turkmenistan) Wahyt Orazsähedow
- (Turkmenistan) Myrat Ýagşyýew
- (Uzbekistan) Alexander Geynrikh
- (Uzbekistan) Anzur Ismailov
- (Vietnam) Nguyễn Anh Đức
- (Vietnam) Nguyễn Văn Quyết
- (Yemen) Ahmed Al-Sarori
- (Yemen) Ala Al-Sasi

1 goal

- (Afghanistan) Hassan Amin
- (Afghanistan) Zohib Islam Amiri
- (Afghanistan) Zubayr Amiri
- (Afghanistan) Faysal Shayesteh
- (Afghanistan) Josef Shirdel
- (Australia) Mathew Leckie
- (Australia) Tommy Oar
- (Bahrain) Komail Al-Aswad
- (Bahrain) Sami Al-Husaini
- (Bahrain) Hussain Ali Baba
- (Bahrain) Sayed Reda Issa
- (Bahrain) Ali Jaafar Mohamed Madan
- (Bahrain) Abdullah Omar
- (Bahrain) Jamal Rashid
- (Bangladesh) Jahid Hasan Ameli
- (Bangladesh) Mamunul Islam
- (Bhutan) Biren Basnet
- (Bhutan) Jigme Dorji
- (Bhutan) Karma Shedrup Tshering
- (Brunei) Adi Said
- (Cambodia) Thierry Bin
- (Cambodia) Chhin Chhoeun
- (Cambodia) Hong Pheng
- (Cambodia) Keo Sokpheng
- (Cambodia) Sos Suhana
- (China) Huang Bowen
- (China) Mei Fang
- (China) Zhang Linpeng
- (China) Zhang Xizhe
- (Chinese Taipei) Chen Chao-an
- (Chinese Taipei) Xavier Chen
- (Chinese Taipei) Chen Hao-wei
- (Chinese Taipei) Chen Yi-wei
- (Chinese Taipei) Huang Wei-min
- (Chinese Taipei) Hung Kai-chun
- (Chinese Taipei) Wang Rui
- (Chinese Taipei) Wen Chih-hao
- (Chinese Taipei) Yaki Yen
- (Guam) Brandon McDonald
- (Guam) Travis Nicklaw
- (Hong Kong) Christian Annan
- (Hong Kong) Bai He
- (Hong Kong) Chan Siu Ki
- (Hong Kong) Ju Yingzhi
- (Hong Kong) Lo Kwan Yee
- (Hong Kong) Paulinho
- (Hong Kong) Sandro
- (Hong Kong) Tan Chun Lok
- (Hong Kong) Jordi Tarrés
- (Hong Kong) Xu Deshuai
- (India) Fulganco Cardozo
- (India) Sumit Passi
- (India) Mohammed Rafique
- (India) Robin Singh
- (India) Rowllin Borges
- (Iran) Karim Ansarifard
- (Iran) Saeid Ezatolahi
- (Iran) Jalal Hosseini
- (Iran) Alireza Jahanbakhsh
- (Iran) Kamal Kamyabinia
- (Iran) Morteza Pouraliganji
- (Iran) Ramin Rezaeian
- (Iran) Masoud Shojaei
- (Iran) Andranik Teymourian
- (Iran) Mehdi Torabi
- (Iraq) Mohannad Abdul-Raheem
- (Iraq) Ali Hosni
- (Iraq) Dhurgham Ismail
- (Iraq) Mahdi Kamel
- (Iraq) Ahmed Yasin
- (Japan) Genki Haraguchi
- (Japan) Hiroshi Kiyotake
- (Japan) Masato Morishige
- (Japan) Takashi Usami
- (Jordan) Yousef Al-Naber
- (Jordan) Yousef Al-Rawashdeh
- (Jordan) Mohannad Al-Souliman
- (Jordan) Musa Al-Taamari
- (Jordan) Baha' Faisal
- (Jordan) Saeed Murjan
- (Kuwait) Ali Maqseed
- (Kuwait) Aziz Mashaan
- (Kuwait) Faisal Zayid
- (Kyrgyzstan) Ildar Amirov
- (Kyrgyzstan) Azamat Baymatov
- (Kyrgyzstan) Edgar Bernhardt
- (Kyrgyzstan) Bakhtiyar Duyshobekov
- (Kyrgyzstan) Viktor Maier
- (Kyrgyzstan) Almazbek Mirzaliev
- (Kyrgyzstan) Bekzhan Sagynbaev
- (Kyrgyzstan) Islam Shamshiev
- (Lebanon) Roda Antar
- (Lebanon) Abbas Ahmed Atwi
- (Lebanon) Samir Ayass
- (Lebanon) Nour Mansour
- (Lebanon) Youssef Mohamad
- (Lebanon) Joan Oumari
- (Lebanon) Feiz Shamsin
- (Macau) Chan Pak Chun
- (Macau) Carlos Leonel
- (Macau) Leong Ka Hang
- (Malaysia) Baddrol Bakhtiar
- (Malaysia) Chanturu Suppiah
- (Malaysia) Khair Jones
- (Malaysia) Mahali Jasuli
- (Malaysia) Mohd Safiq Rahim
- (Malaysia) Safee Sali
- (Malaysia) Syafiq Ahmad
- (Malaysia) Syazwan Zainon
- (Maldives) Ahmed Abdulla
- (Maldives) Asadhulla Abdulla
- (Maldives) Ibrahim Waheed Hassan
- (Maldives) Hamza Mohamed
- (Maldives) Hussain Niyaz Mohamed
- (Maldives) Hussain Sifaau Yoosuf
- (Mongolia) Batmönkhiin Erkhembayar
- (Myanmar) Kyaw Zayar Win
- (Myanmar) Kyi Lin
- (Myanmar) Min Min Thu
- (Myanmar) Suan Lam Mang
- (Myanmar) Yan Naing Oo
- (Myanmar) Zaw Min Tun
- (Nepal) Bimal Gharti Magar
- (Nepal) Bishal Rai
- (Nepal) Nawayug Shrestha
- (North Korea) Jang Kuk-chol
- (North Korea) Kim Yong-il
- (North Korea) Ri Yong-jik
- (North Korea) Ro Hak-su
- (North Korea) So Hyon-uk
- (North Korea) So Kyong-jin
- (Oman) Mohammed Al-Ghassani
- (Oman) Saad Al-Mukhaini
- (Oman) Said Al-Ruzaiqi
- (Oman) Jameel Al-Yahmadi
- (Oman) Salaah Al-Yahyaei
- (Oman) Nadir Mabrook
- (Oman) Qasim Said
- (Pakistan) Hassan Bashir
- (Palestine) Mus'ab Al-Batat
- (Palestine) Ahmed Awad
- (Palestine) Abdullah Jaber
- (Palestine) Matías Jadue
- (Palestine) Mohammad Natour
- (Palestine) Khaled Salem
- (Palestine) Pablo Tamburrini
- (Palestine) Khader Yousef
- (Philippines) Kevin Ingreso
- (Philippines) Manuel Ott
- (Philippines) Mike Ott
- (Philippines) Daisuke Sato
- (Philippines) Stephan Schröck
- (Philippines) James Younghusband
- (Qatar) Ahmed Abdul Maqsoud
- (Qatar) Akram Afif
- (Qatar) Abdelkarim Hassan
- (Qatar) Ismaeel Mohammad
- (Qatar) Sebastián Soria
- (Saudi Arabia) Salman Al-Faraj
- (Saudi Arabia) Osama Hawsawi
- (Saudi Arabia) Naif Hazazi
- (Singapore) Irfan Fandi
- (Singapore) Hariss Harun
- (Singapore) Faris Ramli
- (Singapore) Shakir Hamzah
- (South Korea) Lee Chung-yong
- (South Korea) Lee Jeong-hyeop
- (South Korea) Nam Tae-hee
- (Sri Lanka) Subash Madushan
- (Syria) Moayad Ajan
- (Syria) Oday Al-Jafal
- (Syria) Ahmad Kallasi
- (Syria) Omar Midani
- (Tajikistan) Nuriddin Davronov
- (Tajikistan) Davron Ergashev
- (Tajikistan) Fatkhullo Fatkhuloev
- (Tajikistan) Umedzhon Sharipov
- (Thailand) Tana Chanabut
- (Thailand) Kroekrit Thaweekarn
- (Timor-Leste) Patrick Fabiano
- (Timor-Leste) Rufino Gama
- (Timor-Leste) Jairo Neto
- (Timor-Leste) José Oliveira
- (Timor-Leste) Rodrigo Silva
- (Turkmenistan) Serdaraly Ataýew
- (Turkmenistan) Artur Geworkýan
- (Turkmenistan) Süleýman Muhadow
- (Turkmenistan) Mekan Saparow
- (United Arab Emirates) Mohamed Ahmed
- (United Arab Emirates) Ismail Al Hammadi
- (United Arab Emirates) Ahmed Al Hashmi
- (United Arab Emirates) Habib Fardan
- (United Arab Emirates) Abdullah Mousa
- (United Arab Emirates) Mohanad Salem
- (Uzbekistan) Stanislav Andreev
- (Uzbekistan) Server Djeparov
- (Uzbekistan) Azizbek Haydarov
- (Uzbekistan) Eldor Shomurodov
- (Vietnam) Đinh Thanh Trung
- (Vietnam) Đinh Tiến Thành
- (Vietnam) Mạc Hồng Quân
- (Vietnam) Nguyễn Công Phượng
- (Vietnam) Nguyễn Quang Hải
- (Vietnam) Trần Phi Sơn
- (Yemen) Ayman Al-Hagri
- (Yemen) Mudir Al-Radaei
- (Yemen) Akram Al-Worafi
- (Yemen) Mohammed Boqshan
- (Yemen) Tawfiq Ali Mansour

1 own goal

- (Afghanistan) Sharif Mukhammad (playing against Japan)
- (Bhutan) Biren Basnet (playing against Oman)
- (Cambodia) Khoun Laboravy (playing against Japan)
- (Cambodia) Leng Makara (playing against Syria)
- (Chinese Taipei) Chen Chia-chun (playing against Turkmenistan)
- (Jordan) Mohannad Al-Souliman (playing against Afghanistan)
- (Kyrgyzstan) Ildar Amirov (playing against Australia)
- (Kyrgyzstan) Valery Kichin (playing against Bangladesh)
- (Lebanon) Ali Hamam (playing against South Korea)
- (Macau) Lam Ka Seng (playing against India)
- (Maldives) Amdhan Ali (playing against Oman)
- (Maldives) Mohamed Faisal (playing against Palestine)
- (Maldives) Ali Samooh (playing against Yemen)
- (Myanmar) Zaw Min Tun (playing against Kuwait)
- (Syria) Hamdi Al Masri (playing against Japan)
- (Tajikistan) Davron Ergashev (playing against Yemen)
- (Turkmenistan) Serdar Annaorazow (playing against Guam)
- (Turkmenistan) Mekan Saparow (playing against Oman)
- (Vietnam) Đinh Tiến Thành (playing against Thailand)

Source: the-afc.com

== See also ==
- 2018 FIFA World Cup qualification (AFC)
