= 2019 AFC Asian Cup qualification – third round =

Tournament details
- Dates: 26 March 2017 – 27 March 2018
- Teams: 24 (from 1 confederation)

Tournament statistics
- Matches played: 72
- Goals scored: 243 (3.38 per match)
- Attendance: 544,730 (7,566 per match)
- Top scorer(s): (Oman) Khalid Al-Hajri (8 goals)

The third round of the 2019 AFC Asian Cup qualification was played from 26 March 2017 to 27 March 2018.

== Format ==
A total of 24 teams (16 teams which advanced from the second round and eight teams which advanced from the play-off round) compete in the third round to compete for the final 12 slots in the 2019 AFC Asian Cup. Since the hosts United Arab Emirates advanced to the third round of the 2018 FIFA World Cup qualification, the automatic slot for the hosts is no longer necessary.

The 24 teams were divided into six groups of four teams to play home-and-away round-robin matches. The top two teams of each group qualified for the 2019 AFC Asian Cup, where they were joined by the 12 teams which qualified directly from the second round.

== Qualified teams ==
Teams qualified from second round

Group	Runners-up (Worst 4)	Third place	Fourth place (Best 4)
A	—	Palestine	—
B	Jordan	Kyrgyzstan	—
C	—	Hong Kong	—
D	Oman	Turkmenistan	~~Guam~~ (Note: Guam withdrew from the tournament due to financial constraints. The All Nepal Football Association announced on 27 December 2016 that they accepted an offer from the AFC to replace Guam.)
E	—	Singapore	Afghanistan
F	—	Vietnam	—
G	Lebanon	~~Kuwait~~ (Note: The Kuwait Football Association was suspended by FIFA. Kuwait had a deadline of 11 January 2017 for lifting of the suspension, but they were unable to do so and were replaced by Macau.)	Myanmar
H	North Korea	Philippines	Bahrain

Notes

Teams qualified from play-off round

Round 1 winners Cambodia Yemen Tajikistan Malaysia India	Round 2 winners Maldives Bhutan Chinese Taipei

Teams qualified from Solidarity Cup

Due to the withdrawal of Guam and the suspension of Kuwait, the AFC invited both Nepal and Macau, the top two teams of the 2016 AFC Solidarity Cup, to re-enter 2019 AFC Asian Cup qualification as replacements in order to maintain 24 teams in the third round of the competition.

Finalists
Nepal (replaced Guam)
Macau (replaced Kuwait)

== Draw ==
The draw for the third round was held on 23 January 2017, 16:00 GST (UTC+4), in Abu Dhabi, United Arab Emirates. It was initially scheduled for 18 January 2017, but was delayed.

The 24 teams were drawn into six groups of four. They were seeded using the January 2017 FIFA World Rankings (indicated in parentheses below).

The national teams which eventually qualified are presented in bold.

Pot 1	Pot 2	Pot 3	Pot 4
1. **Jordan** (107); 2. **Oman** (118); 3. **Philippines** (122); 4. **Bahrain** (123); 5. **Kyrgyzstan** (124); 6. **North Korea** (125)	7. **India** (129); 8. **Palestine** (131); 9. Tajikistan (132); 10. **Vietnam** (136); 11. Hong Kong (140); 12. **Turkmenistan** (143)	13. Maldives (145); 14. **Lebanon** (148); 15. **Yemen** (149); 16. Afghanistan (151); 17. Chinese Taipei (157); 18. Myanmar (159)	19. Malaysia (161); 20. Singapore (165); 21. Cambodia (172); 22. Nepal (175); 23. Bhutan (176); 24. Macau (184)

== Schedule ==
The schedule of each matchday was as follows.

Matchday	Dates	Matches
Matchday 1	28 March 2017	1 v 4, 3 v 2
Matchday 2	13 June 2017	4 v 3, 2 v 1
Matchday 3	5 September 2017	4 v 2, 1 v 3
Matchday 4	10 October 2017	2 v 4, 3 v 1
Matchday 5	14 November 2017	4 v 1, 2 v 3
Matchday 6	27 March 2018	1 v 2, 3 v 4

== Groups ==
The top two teams of each group qualified for the final tournament.

Tiebreakers

The teams were ranked according to points (3 points for a win, 1 point for a draw, 0 points for a loss). If tied on points, tiebreakers were applied in the following order (Regulations Article 9.3):

1. Points in head-to-head matches among tied teams;
2. Goal difference in head-to-head matches among tied teams;
3. Goals scored in head-to-head matches among tied teams;
4. Away goals scored in head-to-head matches among tied teams;
5. If more than two teams were tied, and after applying criteria 1 to 4, a subset of teams were still tied, criteria 1 to 4 were reapplied exclusively to this subset of teams;
6. Goal difference in all group matches;
7. Goals scored in all group matches;
8. Penalty shoot-out if only two teams were tied and they met in the last round of the group;
9. Disciplinary points (yellow card = 1 point, red card as a result of two yellow cards = 3 points, direct red card = 3 points, yellow card followed by direct red card = 4 points);
10. Drawing of lots.

=== Group A ===
Pos	Team	Pld	W	D	L	GF	GA	GD	Pts	Qualification	India	Kyrgyzstan	Myanmar	Macau
1	India	6	4	1	1	11	5	+6	**13 (Note: Head-to-head results: India 1–0 Kyrgyzstan, Kyrgyzstan 2–1 India (India are ahead of Kyrgyzstan on head to head away goals).)**	2019 AFC Asian Cup	—	1–0	2–2	4–1
2	Kyrgyzstan	6	4	1	1	14	8	+6	**13**	2019 AFC Asian Cup	2–1	—	5–1	1–0
3	Myanmar	6	2	2	2	10	10	0	**8**		0–1	2–2	—	1–0
4	Macau	6	0	0	6	4	16	−12	**0**		0–2	3–4	0–4	—

Source: AFC
Notes:
28 March 2017
18:00 UTC+6:30

Myanmar	0–1	India
	Report	Chhetri 90+1'

Thuwunna Stadium, Yangon
Attendance: 21,025
Referee: Yu Ming-hsun (Chinese Taipei)
28 March 2017
19:30 UTC+6

Kyrgyzstan	1–0	Macau
Baymatov 70'	Report

Dolen Omurzakov Stadium, Bishkek
Attendance: 10,600
Referee: Masoud Tufayelieh (Syria)

13 June 2017
19:30 UTC+8

Macau	0–4	Myanmar
	Report	Sithu Aung 4', 62'; Kyaw Ko Ko 30'; Min Min Thu 74'

Estádio Campo Desportivo, Macau
Attendance: 1,200
Referee: Kim Dae-yong (South Korea)
13 June 2017
20:00 UTC+5:30

India	1–0	Kyrgyzstan
Chhetri 69'	Report

Sree Kanteerava Stadium, Bangalore
Attendance: 6,213
Referee: Yudai Yamamoto (Japan)

5 September 2017
19:30 UTC+8

Macau	0–2	India
	Report	B. Singh 57', 82'

Estádio Campo Desportivo, Macau
Attendance: 600
Referee: Ahmed Al-Ali (Jordan)

10 October 2017
19:00 UTC+6:30

Myanmar	2–2	Kyrgyzstan
Aung Thu 52'; Kyaw Ko Ko 90+2'	Report	Zemlianukhin 9' (pen.); Maier 49'

Thuwunna Stadium, Yangon
Attendance: 2,886
Referee: Ali Abdulnabi (Bahrain)
11 October 2017
19:30 UTC+5:30

India	4–1	Macau
Borges 28'; Chhetri 60'; Lam Ka Seng 70' (o.g.); Lalpekhlua 90+2'	Report	Torrão 37'

Sree Kanteerava Stadium, Bangalore
Attendance: 4,113
Referee: Yaqoob Abdul Baki (Oman)

14 November 2017
19:30 UTC+8

Macau	3–4	Kyrgyzstan
Chan Pak Chun 72'; Torrão 79' (pen.); Leonel 87'	Report	Zemlianukhin 25' (pen.), 55'; Lux 36'; Murzaev 84'

Estádio Campo Desportivo, Macau
Attendance: 353
Referee: Võ Minh Trí (Vietnam)
14 November 2017
20:00 UTC+5:30

India	2–2	Myanmar
Chhetri 13' (pen.); Lalpekhlua 69'	Report	Yan Naing Oo 1'; Kyaw Ko Ko 19'

Fatorda Stadium, Margao
Attendance: 5,546
Referee: Liu Kwok Man (Hong Kong)

22 March 2018 (Note: Since the Government of Kyrgyzstan had advised them that the AFC Asian Cup 2019 Final Round Group A qualifying match between Kyrgyz Republic and Myanmar should not take place in Bishkek as scheduled on 5 September 2017 due to increased security concerns following Myanmar military clearance operations against Rohingya in August-September 2017, the AFC decided to postpone the match. On 24 November 2017, the AFC announced that the match will be played on 22 March 2018 at a neutral venue, with the Football Federation of the Kyrgyz Republic covering all the costs of the Myanmar team and of the match organisation, including airfares and accommodation. The two Member Associations will be requested to agree on the neutral venue, and if they fail to reach a consensus the AFC will make the appointment. On 12 February 2018, the Football Federation of the Kyrgyz Republic announced that the match is to be played in Incheon, South Korea.)
15:00 UTC+9

Kyrgyzstan	5–1	Myanmar
Shamshiev 2'; Zemlianukhin 5', 63'; Lux 74'; Sagynbaev 87'	Report	Kyaw Ko Ko 83'

Incheon Football Stadium, Incheon (South Korea)
Attendance: 1,068
Referee: Sukhbir Singh (Singapore)

27 March 2018
18:00 UTC+6:30

Myanmar	1–0	Macau
Kyi Lin 74'	Report

Thuwunna Stadium, Yangon
Attendance: 4,638
Referee: Minoru Tōjō (Japan)
27 March 2018
20:00 UTC+6

Kyrgyzstan	2–1	India
Zemlianukhin 2'; Murzaev 72'	Report	Lalpekhlua 88'

Dolen Omurzakov Stadium, Bishkek
Attendance: 9,588
Referee: Ammar Al-Jeneibi (United Arab Emirates)

=== Group B ===
Pos	Team	Pld	W	D	L	GF	GA	GD	Pts	Qualification	Lebanon	North Korea	Hong Kong	Malaysia
1	Lebanon	6	5	1	0	14	4	+10	**16**	2019 AFC Asian Cup	—	5–0	2–0	2–1
2	North Korea	6	3	2	1	13	10	+3	**11**	2019 AFC Asian Cup	2–2	—	2–0	4–1
3	Hong Kong	6	1	2	3	4	7	−3	**5**		0–1	1–1	—	2–0
4	Malaysia	6	0	1	5	5	15	−10	**1**		1–2	1–4	1–1	—

Source: AFC
28 March 2017
18:00 UTC+3

Lebanon	2–0	Hong Kong
Ghaddar 27'; Maatouk 34'	Report

Camille Chamoun Sports City Stadium, Beirut
Attendance: 14,672
Referee: Pranjal Banerjee (India)

13 June 2017
20:00 UTC+8

Hong Kong	1–1	North Korea
Tan Chun Lok 45+1'	Report	Kim Yu-song 46'

Hong Kong Stadium, Hong Kong
Attendance: 8,194
Referee: Jansen Foo (Singapore)
13 June 2017
21:45 UTC+8

Malaysia	1–2	Lebanon
Mahali 43'	Report	Ataya 79', 90+4'

Tan Sri Dato' Haji Hassan Yunos Stadium, Johor Bahru
Attendance: 6,850
Referee: Jameel Abdulhusin (Bahrain)

5 September 2017
17:00 UTC+8:30

North Korea	2–2	Lebanon
Kim Yu-song 23'; Ri Yong-jik 87'	Report	Mansour 47'; Maatouk 90+4'

Kim Il-sung Stadium, Pyongyang
Attendance: 31,000
Referee: Aziz Asimov (Uzbekistan)
5 September 2017
20:45 UTC+8

Malaysia	1–1	Hong Kong
Syazwan 56'	Report	Sandro 53'

Hang Jebat Stadium, Malacca City
Attendance: 3,646
Referee: Chris Beath (Australia)

10 October 2017
20:00 UTC+8

Hong Kong	2–0	Malaysia
Jordi 44'; McKee 49'	Report

Hong Kong Stadium, Hong Kong
Attendance: 7,920
Referee: Nivon Robesh Gamini (Sri Lanka)
10 October 2017
17:30 UTC+3

Lebanon	5–0	North Korea
El-Helwe 21'; Maatouk 25'; Ayass 50'; Hamam 80'; Ataya 90+1'	Report

Camille Chamoun Sports City Stadium, Beirut
Attendance: 3,000
Referee: Minoru Tōjō (Japan)

10 November 2017 (Note: Due to the death of Kim Jong-nam that led to a diplomatic crisis between Malaysia and North Korea, the Malaysian government decided to disallow the Malaysian football team from playing in North Korea for safety reasons. On 10 March 2017, the Asian Football Confederation (AFC) announced that North Korea's home match against Malaysia, originally scheduled for 28 March at the Kim Il-sung Stadium in Pyongyang, would be postponed, with the AFC announcing on 15 March 2017 that the match would be played on 8 June. On 17 May 2017, the AFC announced that the match was postponed for a second time, to 5 October, due to "geo-political tension on the Korean Peninsula". On 28 September 2017, the AFC announced that the match was again postponed after the Malaysian government announced a travel ban on Malaysian nationals visiting North Korea. On 20 October 2017, the AFC announced that both matches between North Korea and Malaysia would be played at a neutral venue in the interests of competition fairness, with North Korea's "home" match played on 10 November 2017 and Malaysia's "home" match played on 13 November 2017.)
20:00 UTC+7

North Korea	4–1	Malaysia
Pak Kwang-ryong 12' (pen.); Kim Yu-song 42'; Kim Yong-il 48'; Jong Il-gwan 59'	Report	Safawi 67'

Buriram Stadium, Buriram (Thailand) (Note: On 15 March 2017, the AFC announced that should diplomatic relations between the two countries not return to normal, the match between North Korea and Malaysia would be played at a neutral venue, and Malaysia's home match against North Korea would also be moved to a neutral venue to preserve sporting values and the spirit of fair play. After the AFC received confirmation that Malaysians were allowed to travel to North Korea, the AFC agreed that the match would be played in Pyongyang. However, at the announcement of the second postponement, the AFC said the venue would be decided after monitoring the safety and security of the AFC Cup and AFC U-23 Championship qualifying matches taking place in North Korea in the coming months. On 20 October 2017, the AFC announced that both matches between North Korea and Malaysia would be played at a neutral venue in the interests of competition fairness, with North Korea's "home" match played on 10 November 2017 and Malaysia's "home" match played on 13 November 2017, which were later confirmed to be played at Thailand.)
Attendance: 287
Referee: Fahad Al-Mirdasi (Saudi Arabia)

13 November 2017
19:00 UTC+7

Malaysia	1–4	North Korea
Safawi 85'	Report	Kim Yu-song 15', 20', 44'; Pak Kwang-ryong 79'

Buriram Stadium, Buriram (Thailand)
Attendance: 504
Referee: Ahmed Al-Kaf (Oman)
14 November 2017
20:00 UTC+8

Hong Kong	0–1	Lebanon
	Report	Maatouk 43' (pen.)

Hong Kong Stadium, Hong Kong
Attendance: 10,109
Referee: Khamis Al-Marri (Qatar)

27 March 2018
17:00 UTC+8:30

North Korea	2–0	Hong Kong
Jong Il-gwan 19'; Pak Kwang-ryong 25'	Report

Kim Il-sung Stadium, Pyongyang
Attendance: 32,000
Referee: Omar Mohamed Al-Ali (United Arab Emirates)
27 March 2018
18:00 UTC+3

Lebanon	2–1	Malaysia
Maatouk 19' (pen.); El-Helwe 90+4'	Report	Syafiq 72'

Camille Chamoun Sports City Stadium, Beirut
Attendance: 3,500
Referee: Valentin Kovalenko (Uzbekistan)

=== Group C ===
Pos	Team	Pld	W	D	L	GF	GA	GD	Pts	Qualification	Jordan	Vietnam	Afghanistan	Cambodia
1	Jordan	6	3	3	0	16	5	+11	**12**	2019 AFC Asian Cup	—	1–1	4–1	7–0
2	Vietnam	6	2	4	0	9	3	+6	**10**	2019 AFC Asian Cup	0–0	—	0–0	5–0
3	Afghanistan	6	1	3	2	7	10	−3	**6**		3–3	1–1	—	2–1
4	Cambodia	6	1	0	5	3	17	−14	**3**		0–1	1–2	1–0	—

Source: AFC
28 March 2017
19:00 UTC+5

Afghanistan	1–1	Vietnam
Amin 69'	Report	Nguyễn Văn Toàn 64'

Pamir Stadium, Dushanbe (Tajikistan) (Note: Afghanistan played their home matches in Tajikistan due to security concerns from the war in Afghanistan.)
Attendance: 2,500
Referee: Turki Al-Khudhayr (Saudi Arabia)
28 March 2017
18:00 UTC+2

Jordan	7–0	Cambodia
Al-Dardour 12', 21', 87'; Al-Bakhit 47'; Al-Saify 61'; Samir 62'; Al-Taamari 90'	Report

King Abdullah II Stadium, Amman
Attendance: 2,000
Referee: Dmitry Mashentsev (Kyrgyzstan)

13 June 2017
18:30 UTC+7

Cambodia	1–0	Afghanistan
Mony Udom 59'	Report

Olympic Stadium, Phnom Penh
Attendance: 40,000
Referee: Mooud Bonyadifar (Iran)
13 June 2017
19:00 UTC+7

Vietnam	0–0	Jordan
	Report

Thống Nhất Stadium, Ho Chi Minh City
Attendance: 12,000
Referee: Ng Chiu Kok (Hong Kong)

5 September 2017
18:30 UTC+7

Cambodia	1–2	Vietnam
Vathanaka 10'	Report	Nguyễn Văn Quyết 4'; Nguyễn Quang Hải 81'

Olympic Stadium, Phnom Penh
Attendance: 34,587
Referee: Minoru Tōjō (Japan)
5 September 2017
20:00 UTC+3

Jordan	4–1	Afghanistan
Murjan 24'; Al-Saify 33'; Al-Bakhit 45' (pen.); Al-Dardour 89'	Report	Amiri 73' (pen.)

King Abdullah II Stadium, Amman
Attendance: 1,036
Referee: Rowan Arumughan (India)

10 October 2017
15:00 UTC+5

Afghanistan	3–3	Jordan
Al-Souliman 15' (o.g.); Islam Amiri 64'; Amani 81'	Report	Abu Amarah 40'; Al-Saify 43' (pen.); Al-Souliman 86'

Pamir Stadium, Dushanbe (Tajikistan)
Attendance: 1,500
Referee: Masoud Tufayelieh (Syria)
10 October 2017
19:00 UTC+7

Vietnam	5–0	Cambodia
Đinh Thanh Trung 13'; Nguyễn Văn Quyết 56'; Nguyễn Anh Đức 60'; Nguyễn Công Phượng 76'; Mạc Hồng Quân 90+2'	Report

Mỹ Đình National Stadium, Hanoi
Attendance: 11,000
Referee: Sivakorn Pu-udom (Thailand)

14 November 2017
18:30 UTC+7

Cambodia	0–1	Jordan
	Report	Abu Amarah 17'

Olympic Stadium, Phnom Penh
Attendance: 18,369
Referee: Ilgiz Tantashev (Uzbekistan)
14 November 2017
19:00 UTC+7

Vietnam	0–0	Afghanistan
	Report

Mỹ Đình National Stadium, Hanoi
Attendance: 28,580
Referee: Jameel Abdulhusin (Bahrain)

27 March 2018
16:00 UTC+5

Afghanistan	2–1	Cambodia
Sharza 26', 45'	Report	Laboravy 70'

Pamir Stadium, Dushanbe (Tajikistan)
Attendance: 3,011
Referee: Jumpei Iida (Japan)
27 March 2018
17:00 UTC+2

Jordan	1–1	Vietnam
Abu Amarah 71'	Report	Nguyễn Anh Đức 24'

King Abdullah II Stadium, Amman
Attendance: 1,562
Referee: Hettikamkanamge Perera (Sri Lanka)

=== Group D ===
Pos	Team	Pld	W	D	L	GF	GA	GD	Pts	Qualification	Oman	Palestine	Maldives	Bhutan
1	Oman	6	5	0	1	28	5	+23	**15 (Note: Head-to-head results: Palestine 2–1 Oman, Oman 1–0 Palestine (Oman are ahead of Palestine on away goals).)**	2019 AFC Asian Cup	—	1–0	5–0	14–0
2	Palestine	6	5	0	1	25	3	+22	**15**	2019 AFC Asian Cup	2–1	—	8–1	10–0
3	Maldives	6	2	0	4	11	19	−8	**6**		1–3	0–3	—	7–0
4	Bhutan	6	0	0	6	2	39	−37	**0**		2–4	0–2	0–2	—

Source: AFC
Notes:
28 March 2017
19:00 UTC+4

Oman	14–0	Bhutan
Al-Muqbali 2', 35', 40', 43', 68', 85'; Al-Mahaijri 25'; Al-Khaldi 30'; Mabrook 44'; Basnet 54' (o.g.); Al-Hajri 70', 74', 90+1' (pen.), 90+2'	Report

Sultan Qaboos Sports Complex, Muscat
Attendance: 4,500
Referee: Hussein Abo Yehia (Lebanon)
28 March 2017
21:00 UTC+5

Maldives	0–3	Palestine
	Report	Maher 62', 65'; Abu Nahyeh 90+2'

National Football Stadium, Malé
Attendance: 6,000
Referee: Aziz Asimov (Uzbekistan)

13 June 2017
18:00 UTC+6

Bhutan	0–2	Maldives
	Report	Fasir 42' (pen.); Ah. Abdulla 75'

Changlimithang Stadium, Thimphu
Attendance: 7,600
Referee: Khurram Shahzad (Pakistan)
13 June 2017
23:00 UTC+3

Palestine	2–1	Oman
Cantillana 13'; Pinto 21'	Report	Al-Mahaijri 45'

Faisal Al-Husseini International Stadium, Al-Ram
Attendance: 11,000
Referee: Sivakorn Pu-udom (Thailand)

5 September 2017
18:00 UTC+6

Bhutan	0–2	Palestine
	Report	Pinto 51'; Bahdari 90+5'

Changlimithang Stadium, Thimphu
Attendance: 7,800
Referee: Ho Wai Sing (Hong Kong)
5 September 2017
19:15 UTC+4

Oman	5–0	Maldives
Al-Khaldi 5'; Al-Hajri 58'; Al-Yahyaei 69'; Al-Yahmadi 86'; Al-Hasani 88'	Report

Sultan Qaboos Sports Complex, Muscat
Attendance: 1,136
Referee: Võ Minh Trí (Vietnam)

10 October 2017
17:00 UTC+3

Palestine	10–0	Bhutan
Bahdari 4', 40', 44'; Jaber 6'; Seyam 22'; Maraaba 29'; Salem 48' (pen.); Natour 60'; Cantillana 62', 69'	Report

Dora International Stadium, Hebron
Attendance: 7,250
Referee: Rowan Arumughan (India)
10 October 2017
21:00 UTC+5

Maldives	1–3	Oman
Fasir 24'	Report	Al-Hajri 15'; Ali 19' (o.g.); Al-Mahaijri 57'

National Football Stadium, Malé
Attendance: 2,884
Referee: Jarred Gillett (Australia)

14 November 2017
18:00 UTC+6

Bhutan	2–4	Oman
Tshering 59'; Gyeltshen 90+3'	Report	Al-Hasani 48'; Ibrahim 76'; Al-Hajri 86'; Al-Ruzaiqi 89'

Changlimithang Stadium, Thimphu
Attendance: 3,100
Referee: Nagor Amir Noor Mohamed (Malaysia)
14 November 2017
16:00 UTC+2

Palestine	8–1	Maldives
Yousef 6', 33'; Faisal 16' (o.g.); Maraaba 30', 53', 54', 59'; Cantillana 56'	Report	N. Hassan 52'

Arab American University Stadium, Jenin
Attendance: 5,750
Referee: Dmitry Mashentsev (Kyrgyzstan)

27 March 2018
19:00 UTC+4

Oman	1–0	Palestine
Al-Hajri 87'	Report

Sultan Qaboos Sports Complex, Muscat
Attendance: 9,700
Referee: Turki Al-Khudhayr (Saudi Arabia)
27 March 2018
21:00 UTC+5

Maldives	7–0	Bhutan
H. Mohamed 35'; N. Hassan 66', 77', 80', 82'; I. Hassan 69'; Yoosuf 90+3'	Report

National Football Stadium, Malé
Attendance: 2,443
Referee: Hasan Akrami (Iran)

=== Group E ===
Pos	Team	Pld	W	D	L	GF	GA	GD	Pts	Qualification	Bahrain	Turkmenistan	Chinese Taipei for Olympic games	Singapore
1	Bahrain	6	4	1	1	15	3	+12	**13**	2019 AFC Asian Cup	—	4–0	5–0	0–0
2	Turkmenistan	6	3	1	2	9	10	−1	**10**	2019 AFC Asian Cup	1–2	—	2–1	2–1
3	Chinese Taipei	6	3	0	3	7	12	−5	**9**		2–1	1–3	—	1–0
4	Singapore	6	0	2	4	3	9	−6	**2**		0–3	1–1	1–2	—

Source: AFC
26 March 2017
18:07 UTC+8

Chinese Taipei	1–3	Turkmenistan
Chen Po-liang 45+2' (pen.)	Report	Annadurdyýew 23'; Mingazow 24'; Chen Chia-chun 83' (o.g.)

Taipei Municipal Stadium, Taipei
Attendance: 5,898
Referee: Kim Hee-gon (South Korea)
28 March 2017
19:00 UTC+3

Bahrain	0–0	Singapore
	Report

Bahrain National Stadium, Riffa
Attendance: 225
Referee: Nivon Robesh Gamini (Sri Lanka)

10 June 2017 (Note: The Singapore - Chinese Taipei match, originally scheduled for 13 June 2017 at the Singapore National Stadium, was brought forward at the request of the Football Association of Singapore to accommodate a possible Singapore - Argentina friendly at the same location on 13 June. In addition, the game will be held away from the Singapore National Stadium due to the venue hosting a rugby test match between Scotland and Italy on the new date.)
21:00 UTC+8

Singapore	1–2	Chinese Taipei
Hariss 6'	Report	Xavier Chen 31'; Chen Chao-an 60'

Jalan Besar Stadium, Singapore
Attendance: 5,234
Referee: Ahmed Al-Ali (Jordan)
13 June 2017
18:00 UTC+5

Turkmenistan	1–2	Bahrain
Ýagşyýew 86'	Report	Al Romaihi 55'; Yaser 80'

Sport Toplumy Stadium, Daşoguz
Attendance: 9,500
Referee: Ma Ning (China PR)

5 September 2017
19:30 UTC+8

Singapore	1–1	Turkmenistan
Shakir 63'	Report	Annadurdyýew 82'

Jalan Besar Stadium, Singapore
Attendance: 3,712
Referee: Yudai Yamamoto (Japan)
5 September 2017
19:00 UTC+3

Bahrain	5–0	Chinese Taipei
Al-Aswad 11'; Madan 45+4'; Abduljabbar 56', 89'; Helal 74'	Report

Bahrain National Stadium, Riffa
Attendance: 362
Referee: Nagor Amir Noor Mohamed (Malaysia)

10 October 2017
18:00 UTC+8

Chinese Taipei	2–1	Bahrain
Chen Po-liang 90'; Chu En-le 90+2'	Report	Abdullatif 17' (pen.)

Taipei Municipal Stadium, Taipei
Attendance: 7,908
Referee: Hiroyuki Kimura (Japan)
10 October 2017
16:30 UTC+5

Turkmenistan	2–1	Singapore
Orazsähedow 18', 90+3'	Report	Irfan 27'

Köpetdag Stadium, Ashgabat
Attendance: 15,400
Referee: Ng Chiu Kok (Hong Kong)

14 November 2017
15:00 UTC+5

Turkmenistan	2–1	Chinese Taipei
Ýagşyýew 22'; Annadurdyýew 40'	Report	Chen Po-liang 88' (pen.)

Sport Toplumy Stadium, Balkanabat
Attendance: 9,500
Referee: Hettikamkanamge Perera (Sri Lanka)
14 November 2017
19:30 UTC+8

Singapore	0–3	Bahrain
	Report	Abduljabbar 65', 84'; Rashid 81'

National Stadium, Singapore
Attendance: 2,628
Referee: Jarred Gillett (Australia)

27 March 2018
19:00 UTC+8

Chinese Taipei	1–0	Singapore
Chen Po-liang 37'	Report

Taipei Municipal Stadium, Taipei
Attendance: 8,139
Referee: Pranjal Banerjee (India)
27 March 2018
19:00 UTC+3

Bahrain	4–0	Turkmenistan
Helal 12', 24'; Issa 64'; Yaser 67'	Report

Bahrain National Stadium, Riffa
Attendance: 100
Referee: Yaqoob Abdul Baki (Oman)

=== Group F ===
Pos	Team	Pld	W	D	L	GF	GA	GD	Pts	Qualification	Philippines	Yemen	Tajikistan	Nepal
1	Philippines	6	3	3	0	13	8	+5	**12**	2019 AFC Asian Cup	—	2–2	2–1	4–1
2	Yemen	6	2	4	0	7	5	+2	**10**	2019 AFC Asian Cup	1–1	—	2–1	2–1
3	Tajikistan	6	2	1	3	10	9	+1	**7**		3–4	0–0	—	3–0
4	Nepal	6	0	2	4	3	11	−8	**2**		0–0	0–0	1–2	—

Source: AFC
28 March 2017
20:00 UTC+8

Philippines	4–1	Nepal
P. Younghusband 21' (pen.), 23'; Ramsay 27'; Patiño 73'	Report	Rai 45+1'

Rizal Memorial Stadium, Manila
Attendance: 1,715
Referee: Yaqoob Abdul Baki (Oman)
28 March 2017
19:00 UTC+3

Yemen	2–1	Tajikistan
D. Ergashev 41' (o.g.); Al-Sasi 63'	Report	Umarbayev 9'

Suheim Bin Hamad Stadium, Doha (Qatar) (Note: Yemen played their home matches in Qatar due to security concerns from the Saudi Arabian-led intervention in Yemen.)
Attendance: 380
Referee: Nagor Amir Noor Mohamed (Malaysia)

13 June 2017
15:00 UTC+5:45

Nepal	0–0	Yemen
	Report

Halchowk Stadium, Kathmandu
Attendance: 700
Referee: Timur Faizullin (Kyrgyzstan)
13 June 2017
21:00 UTC+5

Tajikistan	3–4	Philippines
Umarbayev 57' (pen.); Vasiev 61'; Dzhalilov 90'	Report	P. Younghusband 28'; Patiño 41', 48'; Sato 79'

Pamir Stadium, Dushanbe
Attendance: 15,000
Referee: Hanna Hattab (Syria)

5 September 2017
15:00 UTC+5:45

Nepal	1–2	Tajikistan
Magar 61'	Report	Dzhalilov 25'; Vasiev 29'

ANFA Complex, Lalitpur
Attendance: 1,200
Referee: Mohammed Al-Hoish (Saudi Arabia)
5 September 2017
19:30 UTC+8

Philippines	2–2	Yemen
P. Younghusband 30'; J. Younghusband 71'	Report	Al-Radaei 27'; Al-Matari 55'

Panaad Park and Stadium, Bacolod
Attendance: 2,911
Referee: Kim Dong-jin (South Korea)

10 October 2017
18:00 UTC+5

Tajikistan	3–0	Nepal
Davronov 20' (pen.); Umarbayev 60' (pen.); Dzhalilov 87' (pen.)	Report

Hisor Central Stadium, Hisor
Attendance: 12,000
Referee: Mooud Bonyadifar (Iran)
10 October 2017
18:00 UTC+3

Yemen	1–1	Philippines
Mansour 63'	Report	Mi. Ott 89'

Saoud bin Abdulrahman Stadium, Al Wakrah (Qatar)
Attendance: 2,169
Referee: Wang Di (China PR)

14 November 2017
14:00 UTC+5:45

Nepal	0–0	Philippines
	Report

ANFA Complex, Lalitpur
Attendance: 1,023
Referee: Ahmed Al-Ali (Jordan)
14 November 2017
16:00 UTC+5

Tajikistan	0–0	Yemen
	Report

Hisor Central Stadium, Hisor
Attendance: 12,000
Referee: Hussein Abo Yehia (Lebanon)

27 March 2018
19:30 UTC+8

Philippines	2–1	Tajikistan
Ingreso 74'; P. Younghusband 90+1' (pen.)	Report	Nazarov 64' (pen.)

Rizal Memorial Stadium, Manila
Attendance: 4,671
Referee: Jarred Gillett (Australia)
27 March 2018
18:15 UTC+3

Yemen	2–1	Nepal
Al-Matari 24', 84' (pen.)	Report	N. Shrestha 45+1'

Suheim Bin Hamad Stadium, Doha (Qatar)
Attendance: 7,535
Referee: Aziz Asimov (Uzbekistan)

== Goalscorers ==
There were 243 goals scored in 72 matches, for an average of 3.38 goals per match.

8 goals

- (Oman) Khalid Al-Hajri

6 goals

- (Kyrgyzstan) Anton Zemlianukhin
- (North Korea) Kim Yu-song
- (Oman) Abdul Aziz Al-Muqbali

5 goals

- (Lebanon) Hassan Maatouk
- (Maldives) Naiz Hassan
- (Palestine) Sameh Maraaba
- (Philippines) Phil Younghusband

4 goals

- (Bahrain) Mahdi Abduljabbar
- (Chinese Taipei) Chen Po-liang
- (Jordan) Hamza Al-Dardour
- (Myanmar) Kyaw Ko Ko
- (Palestine) Abdelatif Bahdari
- (Palestine) Jonathan Cantillana
- (India) Sunil Chhetri

3 goals

- (Bahrain) Abdulla Yusuf Helal
- (India) Jeje Lalpekhlua
- (Jordan) Munther Abu Amarah
- (Jordan) Odai Al-Saify
- (Lebanon) Rabih Ataya
- (North Korea) Pak Kwang-ryong
- (Oman) Ahmed Mubarak Al-Mahaijri
- (Philippines) Javier Patiño
- (Tajikistan) Manuchekhr Dzhalilov
- (Tajikistan) Parvizdzhon Umarbayev
- (Turkmenistan) Altymyrat Annadurdyýew
- (Yemen) Abdulwasea Al-Matari

2 goals

- (Afghanistan) Jabar Sharza
- (Bahrain) Abdulla Yaser
- (Lebanon) Hilal El-Helwe
- (India) Balwant Singh
- (Jordan) Yaseen Al-Bakhit
- (Kyrgyzstan) Mirlan Murzaev
- (Kyrgyzstan) Vitalij Lux
- (Macau) Niki Torrão
- (Malaysia) Safawi Rasid
- (Maldives) Ali Fasir
- (Myanmar) Sithu Aung
- (North Korea) Jong Il-gwan
- (Oman) Sami Al-Hasani
- (Oman) Mohsin Al-Khaldi
- (Palestine) Ahmad Maher Wridat
- (Palestine) Yashir Pinto
- (Palestine) Mahmoud Yousef
- (Tajikistan) Dilshod Vasiev
- (Turkmenistan) Myrat Ýagşyýew
- (Turkmenistan) Wahyt Orazsähedow
- (Vietnam) Nguyễn Anh Đức
- (Vietnam) Nguyễn Văn Quyết

1 goal

- (Afghanistan) Hassan Amin
- (Afghanistan) Khaibar Amani
- (Afghanistan) Zohib Islam Amiri
- (Afghanistan) Zubayr Amiri
- (Bahrain) Ali Jaafar Mohamed Madan
- (Bahrain) Ismail Abdullatif
- (Bahrain) Komail Al-Aswad
- (Bahrain) Mohamed Al Romaihi
- (Bahrain) Sayed Reda Issa
- (Bahrain) Jamal Rashid
- (Bhutan) Chencho Gyeltshen
- (Bhutan) Karma Shedrup Tshering
- (Cambodia) Prak Mony Udom
- (Cambodia) Chan Vathanaka
- (Cambodia) Khoun Laboravy
- (Chinese Taipei) Chen Chao-an
- (Chinese Taipei) Chu En-le
- (Chinese Taipei) Xavier Chen
- (Hong Kong) Alessandro Ferreira Leonardo
- (Hong Kong) Jaimes McKee
- (Hong Kong) Tan Chun Lok
- (Hong Kong) Jordi Tarrés
- (India) Rowllin Borges
- (Jordan) Mohannad Khairullah
- (Jordan) Musa Al-Taamari
- (Jordan) Saeed Murjan
- (Jordan) Ahmed Samir
- (Kyrgyzstan) Azamat Baymatov
- (Kyrgyzstan) Viktor Maier
- (Kyrgyzstan) Bekzhan Sagynbaev
- (Kyrgyzstan) Islam Shamshiev
- (Lebanon) Ali Hamam
- (Lebanon) Mohammed Ghaddar
- (Lebanon) Nour Mansour
- (Lebanon) Samir Ayass
- (Macau) Chan Pak Chun
- (Macau) Carlos Fernandes
- (Malaysia) Mahali Jasuli
- (Malaysia) Syafiq Ahmad
- (Malaysia) Syazwan Zainon
- (Maldives) Ahmed Abdulla
- (Maldives) Hamza Mohamed
- (Maldives) Hussain Sifaau Yoosuf
- (Maldives) Ibrahim Waheed Hassan
- (Myanmar) Aung Thu
- (Myanmar) Min Min Thu
- (Myanmar) Kyi Lin
- (Myanmar) Yan Naing Oo
- (Nepal) Bimal Gharti Magar
- (Nepal) Bishal Rai
- (Nepal) Nawayug Shrestha
- (North Korea) Kim Yong-il
- (North Korea) Ri Yong-jik
- (Oman) Said Al-Ruzaiqi
- (Oman) Jameel Al-Yahmadi
- (Oman) Salaah Al-Yahyaei
- (Oman) Raed Ibrahim Saleh
- (Oman) Nadir Mabrook
- (Palestine) Ahmad Abu Nahyeh
- (Palestine) Abdullah Jaber
- (Palestine) Mohammad Natour
- (Palestine) Khaled Salem
- (Palestine) Tamer Seyam
- (Philippines) Kevin Ingreso
- (Philippines) Mike Ott
- (Philippines) Iain Ramsay
- (Philippines) Daisuke Sato
- (Philippines) James Younghusband
- (Singapore) Irfan Fandi
- (Singapore) Shakir Hamzah
- (Singapore) Hariss Harun
- (Tajikistan) Nuriddin Davronov
- (Tajikistan) Akhtam Nazarov
- (Turkmenistan) Ruslan Mingazow
- (Vietnam) Đinh Thanh Trung
- (Vietnam) Mạc Hồng Quân
- (Vietnam) Nguyễn Công Phượng
- (Vietnam) Nguyễn Quang Hải
- (Vietnam) Nguyễn Văn Toàn
- (Yemen) Ala Al-Sasi
- (Yemen) Mudir Al-Radaei
- (Yemen) Tawfiq Ali Mansour

1 own goal

- (Bhutan) Biren Basnet (playing against Oman)
- (Chinese Taipei) Chen Chia-chun (playing against Turkmenistan)
- (Jordan) Mohannad Khairullah (playing against Afghanistan)
- (Macau) Lam Ka Seng (playing against India)
- (Maldives) Amdhan Ali (playing against Oman)
- (Maldives) Mohamed Faisal (playing against Palestine)
- (Tajikistan) Davron Ergashev (playing against Yemen)
