= Ibrahim Waheed Hassan =

Maldivian footballer

Personal information
- Full name: Ibrahim Waheed Hassan
- Date of birth: 15 November 1995 (age 30)
- Place of birth: H. Dh. Nolhivaranfaru, Maldives
- Position: Midfielder

Team information
- Current team: Odi Sports
- Number: 21

Youth career
- 2013–2014: New Radiant
- 2016: TC Sports

Senior career*
Years	Team	Apps	(Gls)
2013–2014	New Radiant		
2013	→ Thoddoo FC (loan)	2	(0)
2015–2018	TC Sports		
2019–2022	Maziya		
2023	→ Valencia (loan)	0	(0)
2023–2024	→ Odi Sports (loan)		
2024–	Odi Sports		

International career^{‡}
2016–	Maldives U23		(0)
2017–	Maldives	8	(3)
- * Club domestic league appearances and goals ‡ National team caps and goals as of 19 November 2019

Ibrahim Waheed Hassan (born 15 November 1995) is a Maldivian professional footballer who plays as a midfielder for Odi Sports Club.

== Career ==
Waheed played for New Radiant, before joining TC Sports in 2017.

== International ==
Waheed was first called up for Maldives national football team in March 2017 for 2019 AFC Asian Cup qualification match against Palestine at home, but was on bench as an unused substitute. He made his debut against Palestine on 14 November 2017, in the 2019 AFC Asian Cup qualification match away from home. He came in as a 59th-minute substitute for Ahmed Zaad.

=== International goals ===
Scores and results list Maldives' goal tally first.

No	Date	Venue	Opponent	Score	Result	Competition
1.	27 March 2018	National Football Stadium, Malé, Maldives	Bhutan	3–0	7–0	2019 AFC Asian Cup qualification
2.	21 September 2022	Track & Field Sports Complex, Bandar Seri Begawan, Brunei	Brunei	1–0	3–0	Friendly
3.	24 September 2022	Track & Field Sports Complex, Bandar Seri Begawan, Brunei	Laos	2–1	3–1	Friendly

== Honours ==
Maldives

- SAFF Championship: 2018
