= Mahmoud Yousef =

Palestinian footballer

Personal information
- Full name: Mahmoud Ali Nafe Yousef
- Date of birth: 30 July 1997 (age 29)
- Place of birth: Acre, Israel
- Height: 1.80 m (5 ft 11 in)
- Position: Winger

Team information
- Current team: Ihud Bnei Kafr Qara

Youth career
- 2008–2015: Ahi Acre

Senior career*
| Years | Team | Apps | (Gls) |
| 2014–2017 | Ahi Acre | 49 | (12) |
| 2017 | F.C. Tzeirei Tamra | 8 | (2) |
| 2017–2018 | Shabab Al-Khalil | | |
| 2018–2019 | Markaz Balata | | (27) |
| 2019–2020 | Hapoel Kfar Saba | 7 | (1) |
| 2020 | → Hapoel Bnei Lod (loan) | 8 | (0) |
| 2020–2021 | Hapoel Bu'eine | 7 | (1) |
| 2021 | Ahva Kafr Mada | 5 | (2) |
| 2021–2022 | Hapoel Karmiel | 13 | (5) |
| 2022 | Ahi Acre | 12 | (7) |
| 2022–2023 | Ihud Bnei Kafr Qara | 20 | (9) |
| 2023 | Maccabi Neve Sha'anan | 8 | (4) |
| 2023–2024 | Ahli Tmara | 8 | (4) |
| 2024 | Maccabi Ahi Iksal | 12 | (3) |

International career
| 2015 | Palestine U20 | | |
| 2017–2019 | Palestine U23 | 3 | (1) |
| 2017 | Palestine | 2 | (2) |
- * Club domestic league appearances and goals as of 1 June 2024

Mahmoud Yousef (Arabic: محمود يوسف; born 30 July 1997) is a footballer who plays as a forward for Ihud Bnei Kafr Qara in Liga Bet. Born in Israel, he played for the Palestine national team.

== International career ==
Yousef scored the winning-goal for Palestine against India in 2016 AFC U-19 Championship qualification on 2 October 2015.

Yousef received his first international call-up for a 2019 AFC Asian Cup qualifier against Bhutan on 10 October 2017.

=== International goals ===
Scores and results list Palestine's goal tally first.

| Goal | Date | Venue | Opponent | Score | Result | Competition |
|---|---|---|---|---|---|---|
| 1. | 14 November 2017 | Arab American University Stadium, Jenin, Palestine | Maldives | 1–0 | 8–1 | 2019 AFC Asian Cup qualification |
| 2. | 14 November 2017 | Arab American University Stadium, Jenin, Palestine | Maldives | 4–0 | 8–1 | 2019 AFC Asian Cup qualification |
