= Hussain Sifaau =

Maldivian association football player

Personal information
- Full name: Hussain Sifaau Yoosuf
- Date of birth: 4 February 1996 (age 30)
- Place of birth: Chanpaage, Maldives
- Position: Defender

Team information
- Current team: Maziya
- Number: 4

Youth career
- Club Eagles

Senior career*
Years	Team	Apps	(Gls)
2018–2022	Club Eagles		
2023–	Maziya		

International career
2018–	Maldives	27	(1)
- * Club domestic league appearances and goals as of 23:12, 17 October 2023 (UTC)

Hussain Sifaau Yoosuf (born 4 February 1996), is a Maldivian footballer currently playing as a defender for Maziya.

== Career statistics ==
=== International ===
As of matches played 28 January 2019.

National team	Year	Apps	Goals
Maldives	2018	6	1
Total		6	1

=== International goals ===
Scores and results list the Maldives' goal tally first.

No	Date	Venue	Opponent	Score	Result	Competition
1.	27 March 2018	Rasmee Dhandu Stadium, Malé, Maldives	Bhutan	7–0	7–0	2019 AFC Asian Cup qualification

== Honours ==
Maldives

- SAFF Championship: 2018
