= Sami Al-Hasani =

Omani footballer (born 1992)

Personal information
- Full name: Sami Khamis Naqi Al-Hasani
- Date of birth: 29 January 1992 (age 34)
- Place of birth: Sur, Oman
- Position: Striker

Team information
- Current team: Sur
- Number: 99

Youth career
- Sur

Senior career*
Years	Team	Apps	(Gls)
- Sur

International career^{‡}
2013–	Oman	11	(3)
- * Club domestic league appearances and goals ‡ National team caps and goals as of 14 November 2017

Sami Khamis Naqi Al-Hasani (Arabic: سامي خميس نقي الحسني; born 29 January 1992), commonly known as Sami Al-Hasani, is an Omani footballer who plays for Sur SC.

== Club career statistics ==
Club	Season	Division	League		Cup		Continental		Other		Total	
Club	Season	Division	Apps	Goals	Apps	Goals	Apps	Goals	Apps	Goals	Apps	Goals
Sur	2013–14	Oman Professional League	-	2	-	0	0	0	-	0	-	2
Sur	Total		-	2	-	0	0	0	-	0	-	2
Career total			-	2	-	0	0	0	-	0	-	2

== International career ==
Sami is part of the first team squad of the Oman national football team. He was selected for the national team for the first time in 2013. He made his first appearance for Oman on 25 December 2013 against Bahrain in the 2014 WAFF Championship. He has made appearances in the 2014 WAFF Championship and the 2015 AFC Asian Cup qualification.

=== International goals ===
Scores and results list Oman's goal tally first.

#	Date	Venue	Opponent	Score	Result	Competition
1.	5 March 2014	Sultan Qaboos Sports Complex, Muscat, Oman	Singapore	3–0	3–1	2015 AFC Asian Cup qualification
2.	5 September 2017	Sultan Qaboos Sports Complex, Muscat, Oman	Maldives	5–0	5–0	2019 AFC Asian Cup qualification
3.	14 November 2017	Changlimithang Stadium, Thimphu, Bhutan	Bhutan	1–0	4–2	2019 AFC Asian Cup qualification
