= Karma Shedrup Tshering =

Bhutanese footballer (born 1990)

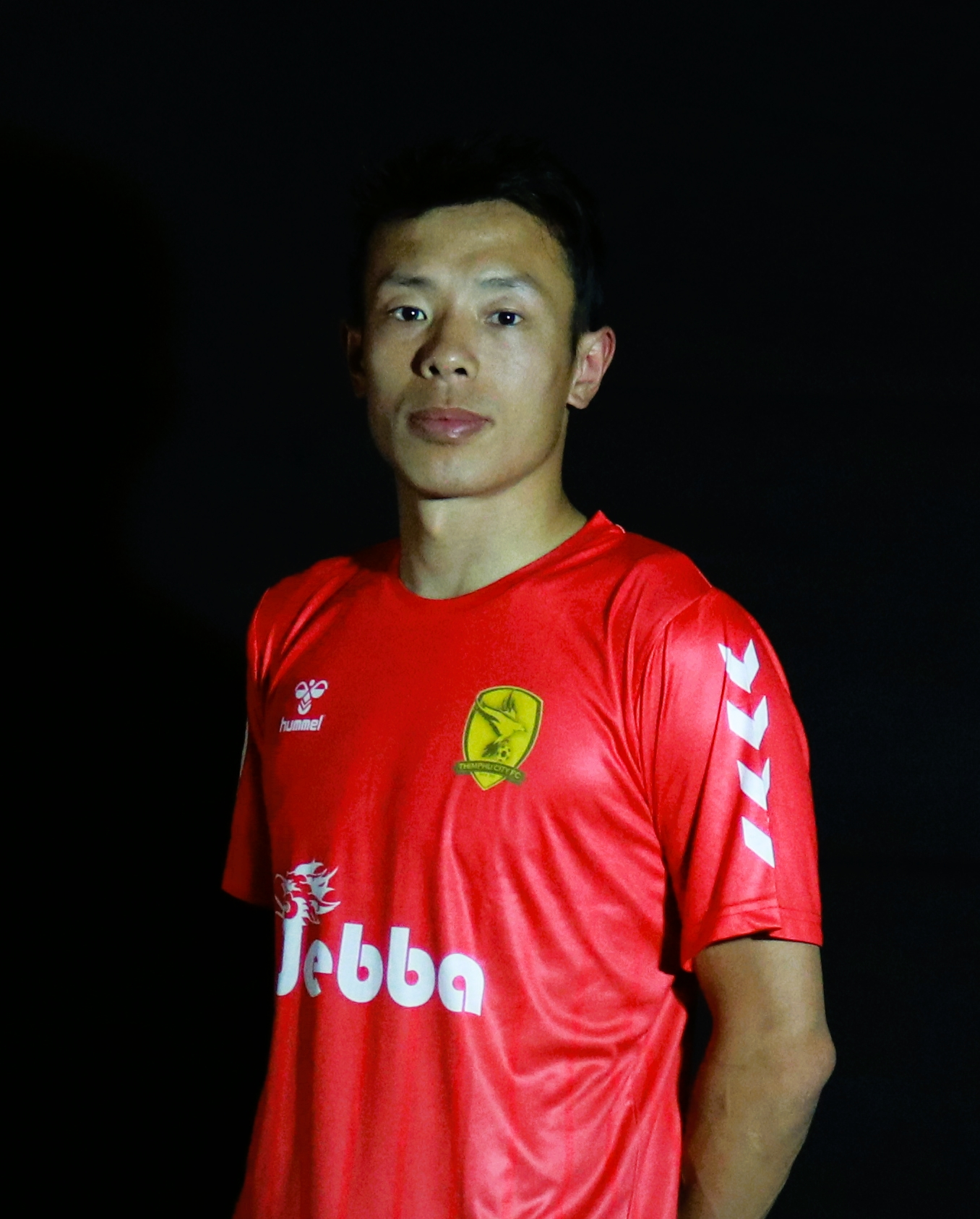
- Tshering with Thimphu City in 2021

Personal information
- Full name: Karma Shedrup Tshering
- Date of birth: April 9, 1990 (age 36)
- Place of birth: Thimphu, Bhutan
- Height: 1.80 m (5 ft 11 in)
- Position: Midfielder

Team information
- Current team: Thimphu City
- Number: 8

Youth career
- 2007–2009: Druk Star

Senior career*
| Years | Team | Apps | (Gls) |
| 2010–2013 | Druk Star | 43 | (11) |
| 2013– | Thimphu City | 79 | (25) |

International career^{‡}
| 2011– | Bhutan | 35 | (1) |
- * Club domestic league appearances and goals ‡ National team caps and goals as of 25 June 2023

Karma Shedrup Tshering (born 9 April 1990) is a Bhutanese professional footballer who plays as a midfielder for Thimphu City and captains the Bhutan national team. He also works as a pilot for the national carrier Druk Air.

== International career ==
=== International goals ===
Scores and results list Bhutan's goal tally first.

| No | Date | Venue | Opponent | Score | Result | Competition |
|---|---|---|---|---|---|---|
| 1. | 14 November 2017 | Changlimithang Stadium, Thimphu, Bhutan | Oman | 1–1 | 2–4 | 2019 AFC Asian Cup qualification |
