= Ahmad Abu Nahyeh =

Palestinian-Israeli footballer

Ahmad Abu Nahyeh أحمد أبو ناهية
Personal information
- Full name: Ahmad Abu Nahyeh
- Date of birth: 7 July 1991 (age 35)
- Place of birth: Umm al-Fahm, Israel
- Height: 1.73 m (5 ft 8 in)
- Position: Striker

Team information
- Current team: Jabal Al-Mukaber

Senior career*
Years	Team	Apps	(Gls)
2011–2013	Maccabi Umm al-Fahm	76	(22)
2013–2015	Bnei Sakhnin	19	(1)
2014	→ Hapoel Ashkelon	11	(2)
2015	→ Maccabi Ahi Nazareth	13	(2)
2015–2017	Shabab Al-Khalil		
2017	Hilal Al-Quds		
2017–2018	Hapoel Umm al-Fahm	7	(2)
2018–2019	Shabab Al-Khalil		
2019–2020	Hapoel Iksal	0	(0)
2020–	Jabal Al-Mukaber	0	(0)

International career^{‡}
2015–	Palestine	9	(6)
- * Club domestic league appearances and goals as of 1 June 2019 ‡ National team caps and goals as of 28 March 2017

Ahmad Abu Nahyeh (Arabic: أحمد أبو ناهية, Hebrew: אחמד אבו נהיה; born 7 July 1991) is a Palestinian-Israeli professional footballer who plays as a striker for Jabal Al-Mukaber.

== International career ==
=== International goals ===
Scores and results list Palestine's goal tally first.

No	Date	Venue	Opponent	Score	Result	Competition
1.	8 October 2015	National Stadium, Dili, East Timor	Timor-Leste	1–1	1–1	2018 FIFA World Cup qualification
2.	12 November 2015	Amman International Stadium, Amman, Jordan	Malaysia	2–0	6–0	2018 FIFA World Cup qualification
3.	12 November 2015	Amman International Stadium, Amman, Jordan	Malaysia	3–0	6–0	2018 FIFA World Cup qualification
4.	12 November 2015	Amman International Stadium, Amman, Jordan	Malaysia	4–0	6–0	2018 FIFA World Cup qualification
5.	5 October 2016	Pamir Stadium, Dushanbe, Tajikistan	Tajikistan	3–2	3–3	Friendly
6.	28 March 2017	National Football Stadium, Malé, Maldives	Maldives	3–0	3–0	2019 AFC Asian Cup qualification
