= Hassan Amin (footballer) =

Afghan footballer

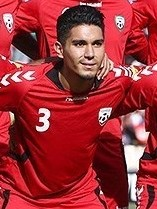
- Amin lining up with Afghanistan in 2015

Personal information
- Date of birth: 12 October 1991 (age 35)
- Place of birth: Darmstadt, Germany
- Height: 1.74 m (5 ft 9 in)
- Position: Left-back

Youth career
- 2010–2011: Darmstadt 98

Senior career*
Years	Team	Apps	(Gls)
2010–2011	Darmstadt 98	6	(0)
2011–2014	Eintracht Frankfurt II	64	(3)
2014–2016	1. FC Saarbrücken	18	(0)
2016–2018	Waldhof Mannheim	64	(4)
2018–2020	SV Meppen	64	(5)
2020–2021	SV Meppen	31	(3)

International career
2014–2019	Afghanistan	28	(2)
- * Club domestic league appearances and goals as of 10:38, 4 July 2021 (UTC)

Hassan Amin (Dari: حسن امين; born 12 October 1991) is an Afghan former professional footballer who played as a left-back. He was a member of the Afghanistan national football team.

== Club career ==
Born in Darmstadt, Amin began his career in the youth of Darmstadt 98. He made his competitive debut for the senior team on 7 September 2010 in a 2–0 home victory over Hoffenheim II.

In May 2011, he moved to Regionalliga club Eintracht Frankfurt II on a free transfer. He made his league debut for the club on 2 March 2012 in a 4–0 home victory over SC Pfullendorf being subbed on for Marcel Titsch-Rivero in the 80th minute. He scored his first competitive goal for the club on 11 August 2012 in a 2–0 away victory over SSV Ulm. His goal, scored in the 63rd minute, made the score 2–0 to Frankfurt II. He spent a total of three seasons there, making 64 league appearances and scoring 3 goals.

In 2014, he joined FC Saarbrücken on a free transfer. He made his league debut for the club on 5 April 2015 in a 2–1 away victory over Hoffenheim II as a substitute for Peter Chrappan at halftime. Over two seasons, Amin played 18 league matches for the club.

In June 2016, Amin signed for SV Waldhof Mannheim on a two-year contract. He made his league debut for the club on 5 August 2016 in a 3–2 away victory over Stuttgarter Kickers. In July 2017, Amin was named captain of the team, succeeding previous captain Michael Fink. He scored his first league goal for the club as part of a brace on 7 August 2017 in a 3–0 home victory over Elversberg. He scored in the 38th and 66th minutes.

In 2018, Amin joined 3. Liga club SV Meppen, signing a two-year contract. He made his league debut for Meppen on 30 July 2018 in a 0–0 away draw with Sportfreunde Lotte. He scored his first league goal for the club on 7 October 2018 in a 1–0 home victory over 1860 Munich. He scored in the 41st minute.

Amin's agent announced Amin's desire to leave SV Meppen for a move abroad in late June 2020. In August, however, Amin agreed a contract extension with the club.

Amin announced his retirement from professional football in June 2022.

== International career ==
Amin was selected by the national team of Afghanistan for the 2014 AFC Challenge Cup. He then played in the World Cup qualification matches. After several matches he became a key player for the national team. With his speed and football knowledge he was a constant threat to other teams. In a 2019 AFC Asian Cup qualifier, Amin scored his first goal for the national team, a screamer in the 70th minute against Vietnam. He was the Captain of Afghanistan in that match.

== Career statistics ==
=== International goals ===
Scores and results list Afghanistan's goal tally first, score column indicates score after each Amin goal.

List of international goals scored by Hassan Amin
No.	Date	Venue	Opponent	Score	Result	Competition
1	28 March 2017	Pamir Stadium, Dushanbe, Tajikistan	Vietnam	1–1	1–1	2019 AFC Asian Cup qualification
2	6 June 2017	Al-Rashid Stadium, Dubai, United Arab Emirates	Maldives	1–0	2–1	Friendly
