= Abdulla Yaser =

Bahraini footballer

Personal information
- Full name: Abdulla Abdo Omar Yasser
- Date of birth: 27 March 1988 (age 38)
- Place of birth: Manama, Bahrain
- Height: 1.70 m (5 ft 7 in)
- Position: Left back

Team information
- Current team: Al-Muharraq
- Number: 6

Senior career*
| Years | Team | Apps | (Gls) |
| 2010–2014 | Al-Riffa | | |
| 2014–2018 | Al-Muharraq | | |

International career^{‡}
| 2008–2010 | Bahrain U23 | 18 | (1) |
| 2007–2018 | Bahrain | 59 | (5) |
- * Club domestic league appearances and goals ‡ National team caps and goals as of 28 March 2018

Abdulla Abdo Omar Yasser (born 27 March 1988) is a Bahraini professional footballer who plays as a defender who currently plays for Al-Muharraq and Bahrain.

== International career ==
On 4 October 2007, Yaser made his debut for the Bahraini national team, starting in a friendly match against Singapore. On 4 January 2009, Yaser scored his first international goal in a 3–1 win against Iraq in the Arabian Gulf Cup in Oman.

=== International goals ===
Scores and Results list Bahrain's goal tally first

| No. | Date | Venue | Opponent | Score | Result | Competition | Ref. |
|---|---|---|---|---|---|---|---|
| 1. | 4 January 2009 | Sultan Qaboos Sports Complex, Muscat, Oman | Iraq | 1–0 | 3–1 | 19th Arabian Gulf Cup | |
| 2. | 30 March 2015 | Bahrain National Stadium, Riffa, Bahrain | Philippines | 2–0 | 2–1 | Friendly | |
| 3. | 1 September 2016 | Bahrain National Stadium, Riffa, Bahrain | Singapore | 2–1 | 3–1 | Friendly | |
| 4. | 13 June 2017 | Sport toplumy, Daşoguz, Turkmenistan | Turkmenistan | 2–0 | 2–1 | 2019 AFC Asian Cup qualification | (AFC) |
| 5. | 27 March 2018 | Bahrain National Stadium, Riffa, Bahrain | Turkmenistan | 4–0 | 4–0 | 2019 AFC Asian Cup qualification | (AFC) |
