= Bekzhan Sagynbayev =

Kyrgyzstani footballer

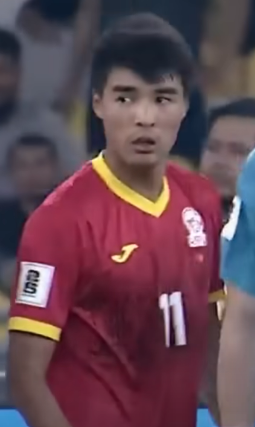
- Sagynbayev in 2023

Personal information
- Full name: Bekzhan Talantbekovich Sagynbayev
- Date of birth: 11 September 1994 (age 32)
- Place of birth: Bishkek, Kyrgyzstan
- Height: 1.79 m (5 ft 10 in)
- Positions: Left winger; left back

Team information
- Current team: FC Bars Issyk-Kul
- Number: 9

Senior career*
Years	Team	Apps	(Gls)
2010–2022	Dordoi Bishkek	56	(11)
2022–2023	Kitchee	5	(1)
2023–2024	Dordoi Bishkek	13	(0)
2024	Abdysh-Ata		
2025	Bars		

International career^{‡}
2018–2019	Kyrgyzstan	19	(4)
- * Club domestic league appearances and goals as of 1 June 2023 ‡ National team caps and goals as of 15 June 2021

Bekzhan Talantbekovich Sagynbayev (Kyrgyz: Бекжан Сагынбаев; Russian: Бекжан Талантбекович Сагынбаев; born 11 September 1994) is a Kyrgyzstani professional footballer who plays as a left winger or left back.

== Club career ==
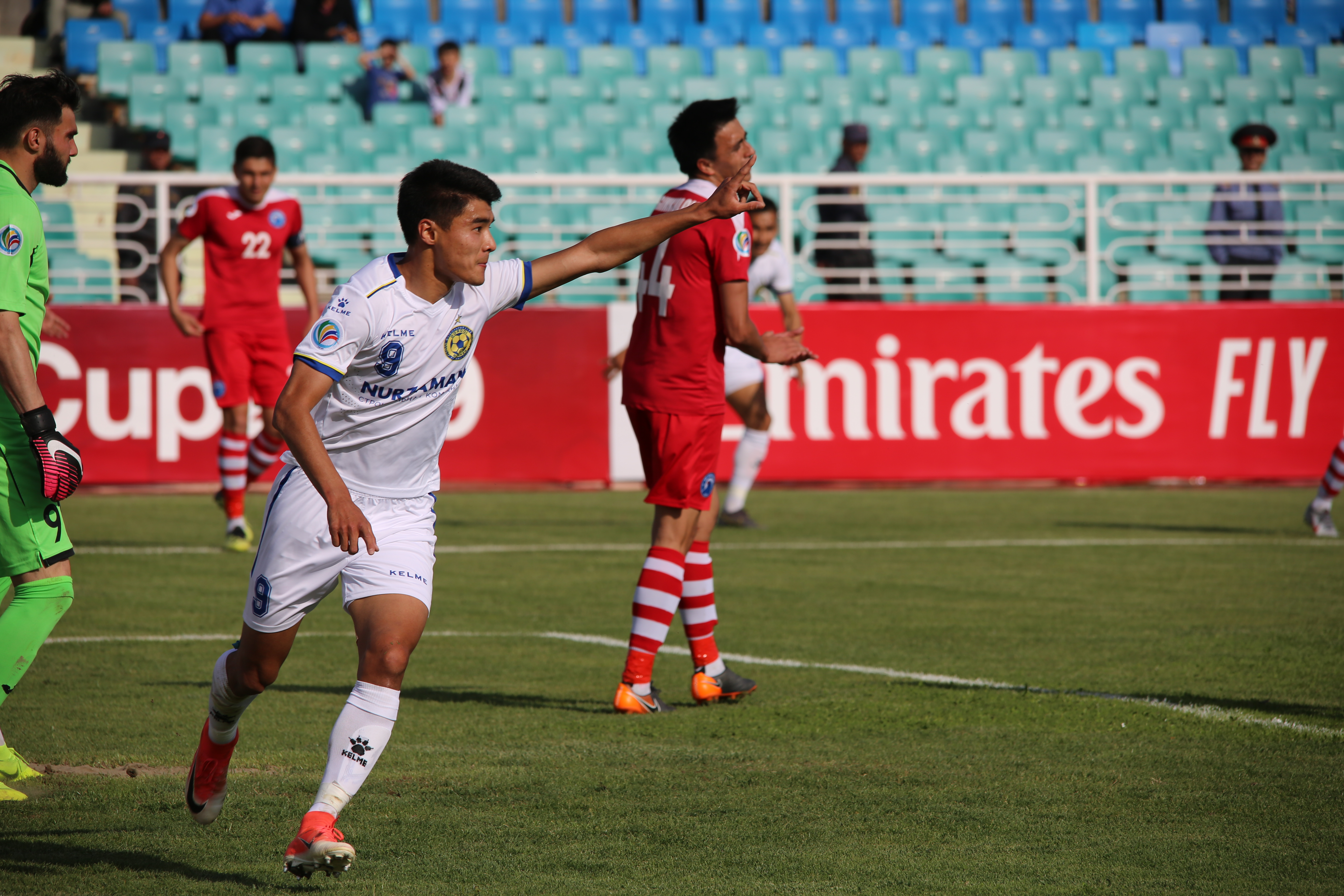
Sagynbayev in 2019.

Sagynbayev won the Kyrgyzstan League in 2018 with Dordoi Bishkek.

In November 2022, Sagynbayev joined Hong Kong Premier League club Kitchee.

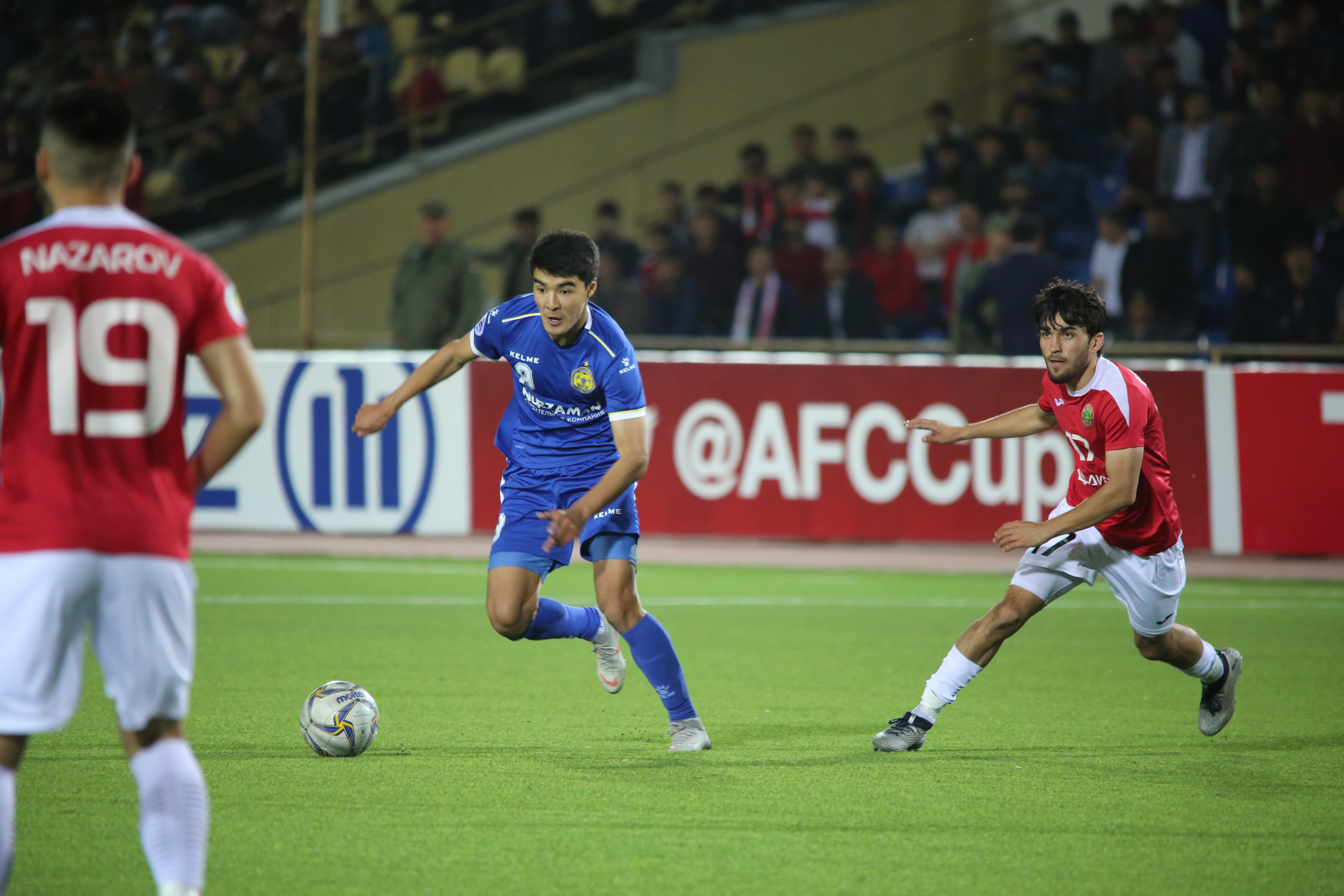
Bekzhan Sagynbayev - AFC Cup 2019

== International career ==
Sagynbayev made his debut for the Kyrgyzstan national football team in a 2019 AFC Asian Cup qualification match on 22 March 2018, against Myanmar. Kyrgyzstan won the match 5–1 and Sagynbayev scored the last goal. He was included in Kyrgyzstan's squad for the 2019 AFC Asian Cup in the United Arab Emirates.

== Career statistics ==
=== International ===
Statistics accurate as of match played 21 January 2019

Kyrgyzstan national team
Year	Apps	Goals
2018	8	3
2019	4	0
Total	11	3

==== International goals ====
Scores and results list Kyrgyzstan's goal tally first.

No	Date	Venue	Opponent	Score	Result	Competition
1.	22 March 2018	Incheon Football Stadium, Incheon, South Korea	Myanmar	5–1	5–1	2019 AFC Asian Cup qualification
2.	10 September 2018	Dolen Omurzakov Stadium, Bishkek, Kyrgyzstan	Syria	2–1	2–1	friendly
3.	16 October 2018	Hang Jebat Stadium, Melaka, Malaysia	Malaysia	1–0	1–0	friendly

== Honours ==
Kitchee

- Hong Kong Premier League: 2022–23
- Hong Kong Senior Challenge Shield: 2022–23
- Hong Kong FA Cup: 2022–23
