= Ri Yong-jik =

North Korean footballer (born 1991)

Ri Yong-jik 李榮直
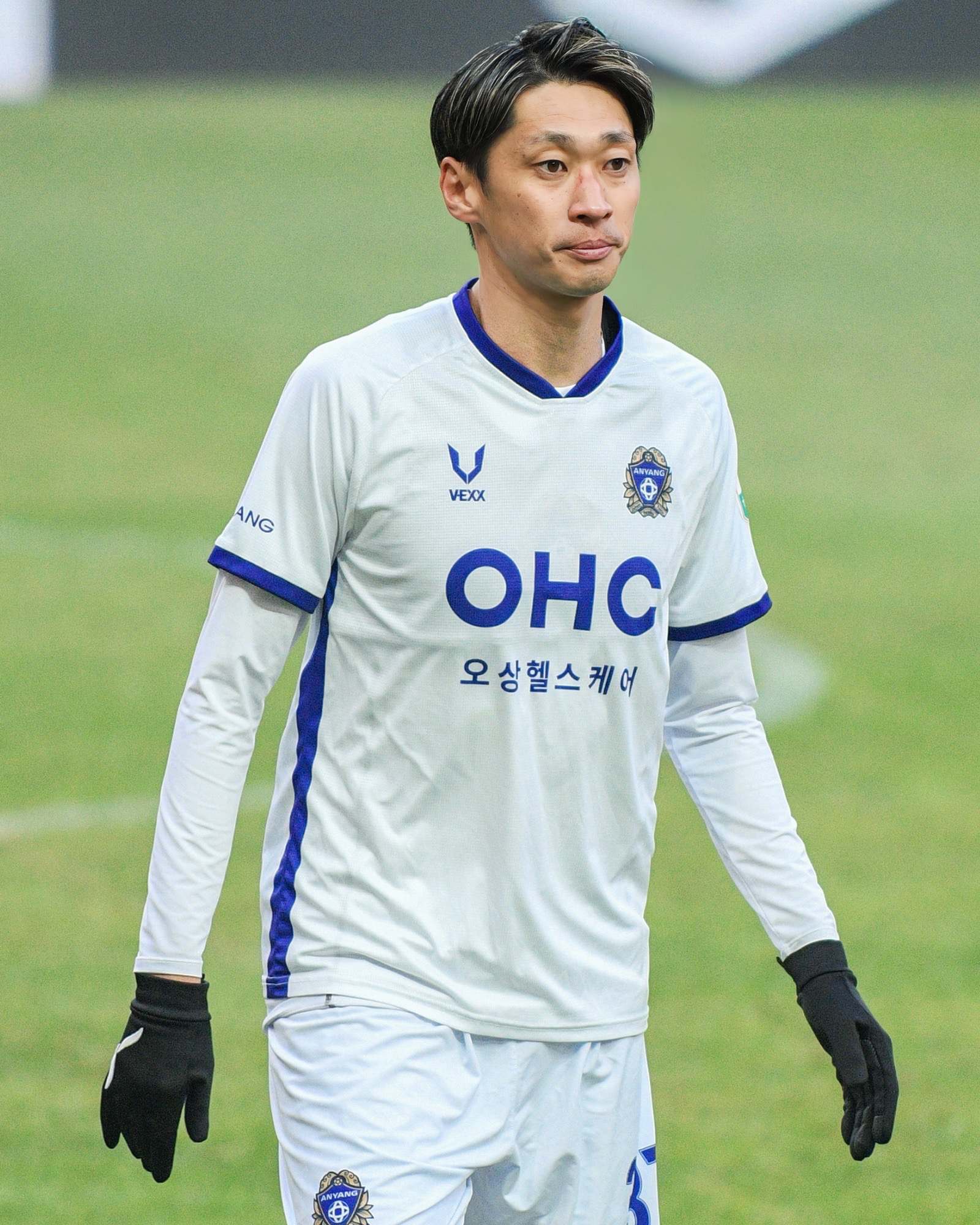
- Ri in 2025

Personal information
- Date of birth: 8 February 1991 (age 35)
- Place of birth: Osaka, Japan
- Height: 1.87 m (6 ft 2 in)
- Position: Defensive midfielder

Team information
- Current team: Gwangju FC
- Number: 37

Youth career
- 2010–2011: Osaka University of Commerce
- 2011–2012: Tokushima Vortis

Senior career*
Years	Team	Apps	(Gls)
2013–2014	Tokushima Vortis	6	(1)
2015–2016	V-Varen Nagasaki	47	(4)
2017	Kamatamare Sanuki	23	(2)
2018–2019	Tokyo Verdy	51	(8)
2020–2022	FC Ryukyu	91	(1)
2023	Iwate Grulla Morioka	30	(1)
2024–2025	FC Anyang	43	(3)
2025	→ Busan IPark (loan)	2	(0)
2026–	Gwangju FC	3	(0)

International career
2015–	North Korea	23	(1)
- * Club domestic league appearances and goals as of 4 August 2026

- Ri Yong-jik
- Hangul: 리영직
- Hanja: 李榮直
- RR: Ri Yeongjik
- MR: Ri Yŏngjik

Ri Yong-jik (李榮直, Ri Yŏngjik, born 8 February 1991), also known as Lee Yong-jick, is a professional footballer who plays as a defensive midfielder for Gwangju FC. Born in Japan, he represents the North Korea national team.

== Career ==
On 7 January 2020, Ri joined the J2 League club FC Ryukyu ahead of the 2020 J2 League season.

On 28 December 2022, Ri joined the J3 relegated club Iwate Grulla Morioka for the upcoming 2023 season.

On 7 March 2024, Ri joined K League 2 club FC Anyang.

== International career ==
Ri received a red card in a game against Saudi Arabia.

== Career statistics ==
=== Club ===
As of the start for 2025 season.

Appearances and goals by club, season and competition
Club	Season	League			National cup (Note: Includes Emperor's Cup, Korean FA Cup)		League cup (Note: Includes J. League Cup)		Total	
Club	Season	Division	Apps	Goals	Apps	Goals	Apps	Goals	Apps	Goals
Tokushima Vortis	2013	J.League Div 2	1	0	0	0	—		1	0
Tokushima Vortis	2014	J.League Div 1	5	1	1	0	3	0	9	1
Tokushima Vortis	Total		6	1	1	0	3	0	10	1
V-Varen Nagasaki	2015	J2 League	27	3	1	1	—		28	4
V-Varen Nagasaki	2016	J2 League	20	1	1	0	—		21	1
V-Varen Nagasaki	Total		47	4	2	1	—		49	5
Kamatamare Sanuki	2017	J2 League	23	2	1	0	—		24	2
Tokyo Verdy	2018	J2 League	26	4	3	2	—		29	6
Tokyo Verdy	2019	J2 League	25	4	0	0	—		25	4
Tokyo Verdy	Total		51	8	3	2	—		54	10
FC Ryukyu	2020	J2 League	38	0	0	0	—		38	0
FC Ryukyu	2021	J2 League	27	1	0	0	—		27	1
FC Ryukyu	2022	J2 League	26	0	0	0	—		26	0
FC Ryukyu	Total		91	1	0	0	—		91	1
Iwate Grulla Morioka	2023	J3 League	30	1	0	0	—		0	0
FC Anyang	2024	K League 2	29	3	1	0	—		30	3
FC Anyang	2025	K League 1	0	0	0	0	—		0	0
FC Anyang	Total		29	3	1	0	—		30	3
Career total			280	19	8	3	3	0	291	22

=== International ===
Scores and results list North Korea's goal tally first, score column indicates score after each Ri goal.

List of international goals scored by Ri Yong-jik
No.	Date	Venue	Opponent	Score	Result	Competition
1	5 September 2017	Kim Il-sung Stadium, Pyongyang, North Korea	Lebanon	2–1	2–2	2019 AFC Asian Cup qualification

== Honours ==
FC Anyang

- K League 2: 2024
