= Abdulwasea Al-Matari =

Yemeni footballer

Abdulwasea Al-Matari عبد الواسع المطري
Personal information
- Full name: Abdulwasea Al-Matari
- Date of birth: 4 July 1994 (age 32)
- Place of birth: Sana'a, Yemen
- Height: 1.70 m (5 ft 7 in)
- Position: Midfielder

Team information
- Current team: Sitra
- Number: 7

Senior career*
Years	Team	Apps	(Gls)
2013–2015	Al Yarmuk Al Rawda		
2015–2018	Al-Orouba		(9)
2018–2019	Dibba Al-Hisn	18	(4)
2019–2020	Al-Nahda		
2020–2021	Al-Nasr		
2021-2022	Al-Ittihad	20	(3)
2023–	Sitra		

International career^{‡}
2013–	Yemen	79	(15)
- * Club domestic league appearances and goals as of 18 December 2018 ‡ National team caps and goals as of 30 September 2026

Abdulwasea Al-Matari (Arabic: عبد الواسع المطري; born 4 July 1994) is a Yemeni football midfielder who plays for Bahraini Premier League club Sitra and captains the Yemen national team.

== International career ==
Al-Matari made his international debut in 2013 in a 2–0 defeat to Bahrain in the 2015 Asian Cup qualifiers.

His first international goal came against Pakistan in the 2018 World Cup qualifiers, a match which Yemen won 3–1.

On 12 October 2023, Al Matari scored his 10th international goal against Sri Lanka, scoring a free kick in the dying minute of the match in the 2026 FIFA World Cup qualifiers.

=== International goals ===
Scores and results list Yemen's goal tally first.

List of international goals scored by Abdulwasea Al-Matari
No.	Date	Venue	Opponent	Score	Result	Competition
1.	13 March 2015	Grand Hamad Stadium, Doha, Qatar	Pakistan	1–0	3–1	2018 FIFA World Cup qualification
2.	7 June 2016	Grand Hamad Stadium, Doha, Qatar	Maldives	1–0	2–0	2019 AFC Asian Cup qualification
3.	5 September 2017	Panaad Park and Stadium, Bacolod, Philippines	Philippines	2–1	2–2	2019 AFC Asian Cup qualification
4.	27 March 2018	Suheim bin Hamad Stadium, Doha, Qatar	Nepal	1–0	2–1	2019 AFC Asian Cup qualification
5.	27 March 2018	Suheim bin Hamad Stadium, Doha, Qatar	Nepal	2–1	2–1	2019 AFC Asian Cup qualification
6.	8 August 2019	Karbala International Stadium, Karbala, Iraq	Lebanon	2–1	2–1	2019 WAFF Championship
7.	11 August 2019	Karbala International Stadium, Karbala, Iraq	Iraq	1–2	1–2	2019 WAFF Championship
8.	5 September 2019	National Stadium, Kallang, Singapore	Singapore	1–1	2–2	2022 FIFA World Cup qualification
9.	9 January 2023	Basra International Stadium, Basra, Iraq	Oman	1–1	2–3	25th Arabian Gulf Cup
10.	12 October 2023	Damac Club Stadium, Khamis Mushait, Saudi Arabia	Sri Lanka	3–0	3–0	2026 FIFA World Cup qualification
11.	17 October 2023	Colombo Racecourse, Colombo, Sri Lanka	Sri Lanka	1–0	1–1	2026 FIFA World Cup qualification
12.	9 October 2025	Hassanal Bolkiah National Stadium, Bandar Seri Begawan, Brunei	Brunei	1–0	2–0	2027 AFC Asian Cup qualification
13.	26 November 2025	Grand Hamad Stadium, Doha, Qatar	Comoros	3–1	4–4 (2–4 p)	2025 FIFA Arab Cup qualification
14.	26 November 2025	Grand Hamad Stadium, Doha, Qatar	Comoros	4–2	4–4 (2–4 p)	2025 FIFA Arab Cup qualification
15.	30 September 2026	Prince Abdullah Al-Faisal Sports City Stadium, Jeddah, Saudi Arabia	Bahrain	2–1	5–2	27th Arabian Gulf Cup
