= Islam Shamshiyev =

Kyrgyzstani footballer (born 1991)

Personal information
- Full name: Islam Akbaraliyevich Shamshiyev
- Date of birth: 1 March 1991 (age 35)
- Place of birth: Kyrgyzstan
- Height: 1.84 m (6 ft 0 in)
- Position: Midfielder

Team information
- Current team: Alay Osh
- Number: 88

Senior career*
| Years | Team | Apps | (Gls) |
| 2005–2008 | Shakhtyor Kyzyl-Kiya | | |
| 2008–2018 | Dordoi Bishkek | | |
| 2019 | Alay Osh | 7 | (3) |
| 2020 | Master 7 | | |
| 2020 | Kaganat | 5 | (0) |
| 2021 | Neftchi | 9 | (0) |
| 2021— | Alay Osh | 2 | (0) |

International career^{‡}
| 2010 – | Kyrgyzstan | 19 | (1) |
- * Club domestic league appearances and goals as of 18:43, 4 August 2021 (UTC) ‡ National team caps and goals as of 1 February 2019

Islam Akbaraliyevich Shamshiyev (Kyrgyz: Ислам Шамшиев; Russian: Ислам Акбаралиевич Шамшиев; born 1 March 1991) is a Kyrgyzstani footballer who plays as a midfielder for Alay Osh.

== Club career ==
In January 2020, Shamshiyev joined Master 7 FC in Laos. He returned to Kyrgyzstan in March 2020, joining FC Kaganat.

After a spell at Neftchi, Shamshiyev moved to FC Alay in the summer 2021.

== International career ==
Shamshiyev is a member of the Kyrgyzstan national team.

Shamshiyev missed the 2019 AFC Asian Cup due to a knee injury that required surgery.

== Career statistics ==
Kyrgyzstan national team
| Year | Apps | Goals |
|---|---|---|
| 2010 | 1 | 0 |
| 2011 | 0 | 0 |
| 2012 | 0 | 0 |
| 2013 | 2 | 0 |
| 2014 | 2 | 0 |
| 2015 | 2 | 0 |
| 2016 | 7 | 0 |
| 2017 | 2 | 0 |
| 2018 | 3 | 1 |
| Total | 19 | 1 |

Statistics accurate as of match played 29 May 2018

Scores and results list Kyrgyzstan's goal tally first.

| No | Date | Venue | Opponent | Score | Result | Competition |
|---|---|---|---|---|---|---|
| 1. | 22 March 2018 | Incheon Football Stadium, Incheon, South Korea | Myanmar | 1–0 | 5–1 | 2019 AFC Asian Cup qualification |
