= Jabar Sharza =

Afghan footballer (born 1994)

Jabar Sharza جبار شرزه
Personal information
- Full name: Jabar Sharza
- Date of birth: 6 April 1994 (age 32)
- Place of birth: Kabul, Afghanistan
- Height: 1.79 m (5 ft 10 in)
- Position: Attacking midfielder

Team information
- Current team: Abu Muslim
- Number: 10

Youth career
- Lyngby BK
- GVI

Senior career*
Years	Team	Apps	(Gls)
2013–2014	GVI	5	(5)
2014–2016	Brønshøj	31	(19)
2016–2017	Akademisk	26	(4)
2017–2018	Fremad Amager	31	(12)
2019–2020	HIFK	25	(4)
2021–2022	Persela Lamongan	10	(3)
2022	→ Persiraja Banda Aceh (loan)	11	(1)
2022–2023	Ariana	17	(4)
2024	Brønshøj		
2024	Ariana	5	(1)
2024–	Abu Muslim		

International career
2017–	Afghanistan	15	(4)
- * Club domestic league appearances and goals

Jabar Sharza (Dari: جبار شرزه, born 6 April 1994) is an Afghan professional footballer who plays as an attacking midfielder for Abu Muslim FC, which plays in the Afghanistan Champions League. He is a member of the Afghanistan national football team.

== Youth career ==
Sharza began his youth career with Lyngby Boldklub. Sharza played also in the youth of Gentofte before making his debut for the senior team.

== Club career ==
=== Gentofte ===
Sharza played 5 games for the Danish club and scored 5 goals. He made a free transfer to Brønshøj in the 2014–2015 season.

=== Brønshøj Boldklub ===
After making just 2 appearances in the 1st division, he played the 2015–2016 season with Brønshøj in the 2nd division. Sharza scored 19 goals in 29 games, before making a transfer to Akademisk.

=== Akademisk Boldklub ===
Sharza made an immediate impact in the 2016–2017 season for Akademisk with scoring off freekicks.

=== Fremad Amager ===
Sharza signed for Fremad Amager in June 2017, and left the club at the end of 2018.

=== HIFK ===
On 21 July 2019, newly promoted Finnish Veikkausliiga club HIFK announced, that they had signed a 1.5-year contract with Sharza.

=== Persela Lamongan ===
On 25 September 2021, Sharza signed a one-year contract with Indonesian Liga 1 club Persela Lamongan on a free transfer. On 3 October, Sharza made his first league debut in a 3–0 loss against Arema as a substitute for Riyatno Abiyoso in the 74th minute at the Gelora Bung Karno Madya Stadium. On 16 October, Sharza scored his first goal for Persela against Madura United in the 55th minute at the Maguwoharjo Stadium, Sleman.

=== Return to Brønshøj ===
After two years in Swedish football, Sharza returned to Brønshøj Boldklub in March 2024.

== International career ==
Sharza was called up in January for the national team of Afghanistan. He made his debut for Afghanistan in a friendly 2–1 win over Singapore on 23 March 2017. He then made a second appearance for Afghanistan which happened to be against Cambodia and helped them win 2–1 by scoring twice in the first half.

On 12 October 2023, Sharza scored the only goal in a 1–0 win against Mongolia in the 2026 FIFA World Cup qualifiers.

== Career statistics ==
=== Club ===
As of 2 December 2024.

Appearances and goals by club, season and competition
Club	Season	League			Cup (Note: Includes Danish Cup and Finnish Cup)		Total	
Club	Season	Division	Apps	Goals	Apps	Goals	Apps	Goals
GVI	2013–14	Danish 2nd Division	5	5	–		5	5
Brønshøj	2014–15	Danish 1st Division	2	0	–		2	0
Brønshøj	2015–16	Danish 2nd Division	29	19	3	4	32	23
Brønshøj	Total		31	19	3	4	34	23
Akademisk BK	2016–17	Danish 1st Division	26	4	2	2	28	6
Fremad Amager	2017–18	Danish 1st Division	24	10	2	0	26	10
Fremad Amager	2018–19	Danish 1st Division	7	2	2	4	9	6
Fremad Amager	Total		31	12	4	4	35	16
HIFK	2019	Veikkausliiga	10	2	–		10	2
HIFK	2020	Veikkausliiga	15	2	4	0	19	2
HIFK	Total		25	4	4	0	29	2
Persela Lamongan	2021–22	Indonesian Liga 1	10	3	–		10	3
Persiraja Banda Aceh (loan)	2021–22	Indonesian Liga 1	11	1	–		11	1
Ariana	2022	Swedish Division 2	8	3	–		8	3
Ariana	2023	Ettan	9	1	–		9	1
Ariana	Total		17	4	0	0	17	4
Brønshøj	2023–24	Denmark Series						
Ariana	2024	Ettan	5	1	–		5	1
Abu Muslim	2025	Afghanistan Champions League						
Career total			161	53	13	10	174	63

=== International goals ===
Scores and results list Afghanistan's goal tally first.

No	Date	Venue	Opponent	Score	Result	Competition
1.	27 March 2018	Pamir Stadium, Dushanbe, Tajikistan	Cambodia	1–0	2–1	2019 AFC Asian Cup qualification
2.	27 March 2018	Pamir Stadium, Dushanbe, Tajikistan	Cambodia	2–0	2–1	2019 AFC Asian Cup qualification
3.	7 September 2023	Bashundhara Kings Arena, Dhaka, Bangladesh	Bangladesh	1–0	1–1	Friendly
4.	12 October 2023	Central Republican Stadium, Dushanbe, Tajikistan	Mongolia	1–0	1–0	2026 FIFA World Cup qualification
