= Viktor Maier =

Kyrgyzstani-German footballer (born 1990)

Personal information
- Date of birth: 16 May 1990 (age 36)
- Place of birth: Kant, Kirghiz SSR, Soviet Union
- Height: 1.84 m (6 ft 0 in)
- Position: Winger

Youth career
- BW Schinkel
- –2006: VfL Osnabrück
- 2006–2009: Hamburger SV

Senior career*
Years	Team	Apps	(Gls)
2008–2011	Hamburger SV II	31	(0)
2011	Sportfreunde Lotte	0	(0)
2012–2013	VfL Osnabrück II	28	(8)
2013	TSV Havelse	6	(0)
2014–2016	SV Meppen	63	(14)
2016–2017	FC Emmen	20	(0)
2017–2021	SC Wiedenbrück	60	(16)
2021–2023	FC Eintracht Rheine	40	(8)
2023–2024	SV Vorwärts Nordhorn	7	(1)

International career^{‡}
2005–2006	Germany U16	4	(0)
2006–2007	Germany U17	10	(0)
2015–2023	Kyrgyzstan	23	(4)
- * Club domestic league appearances and goals as of 08:07, 4 July 2024 (UTC) ‡ National team caps and goals as of 21 April 2026

Viktor Maier (Russian: Виктор Майер, romanized: Viktor Mayer; born 16 May 1990) is a professional former footballer who played as a winger. Born in what is now Kyrgyzstan to ethnic German parents and growing up in Germany, he played for the Kyrgyzstan national team.

== Early life ==
Maier was born in Kant, Kirghiz SSR, Soviet Union, but emigrated with his parents to Osnabrück, Germany, when he was just ten months old.

== Career ==
Maier was called up in May 2015 by Aleksandr Krestinin to represent Kyrgyzstan national team in the 2018 FIFA World Cup Qualifiers against Bangladesh and Australia. He made his debut in a 3–1 victory against Bangladesh, playing the full match.

Since 2023, he has been a player-assistant coach at the German club Vorwärts Nordhorn. Since October 2025, he has been the club's head coach.

== Career statistics ==
Appearances and goals by national team and year
National team	Year	Apps	Goals
Kyrgyzstan	2015	7	0
Kyrgyzstan	2016	6	0
Kyrgyzstan	2017	4	1
Kyrgyzstan	2018	1	0
Kyrgyzstan	2019	3	0
Kyrgyzstan	2022	2	3
Total		23	4

Scores and results list Kyrgyzstan's goal tally first, score column indicates score after each Maier goal.

List of international goals scored by Viktor Maier
No.	Date	Venue	Opponent	Score	Result	Competition
1	10 October 2017	Thuwunna Stadium, Yangon, Myanmar	Myanmar	2–0	2–2	2019 AFC Asian Cup qualification
2	8 June 2022	Dolen Omurzakov Stadium, Bishkek, Kyrgyzstan	Singapore	2–1	2–1	2023 AFC Asian Cup qualification
3	11 June 2022	Dolen Omurzakov Stadium, Bishkek, Kyrgyzstan	Myanmar	1–0	2–0	2023 AFC Asian Cup qualification
4	11 June 2022	Dolen Omurzakov Stadium, Bishkek, Kyrgyzstan	Myanmar	2–0	2–0	2023 AFC Asian Cup qualification
