= Biren Basnet =

Bhutanese footballer (born 1994)

Personal information
- Full name: Biren Basnet
- Date of birth: 20 October 1994 (age 32)
- Place of birth: Punakha, Bhutan
- Height: 1.70 m (5 ft 7 in)
- Position: Central midfielder

Team information
- Current team: Thimphu City

Youth career
- 2007–2010: Druk Star

Senior career*
Years	Team	Apps	(Gls)
2010–2011	Druk Star	22	(6)
2012–2016	Ugyen Academy	65	(18)
2016–2017	Kenkre		
2017	Thimphu City		
2018	Quartz Calicut		
2018–	Thimphu City		

International career
2012–	Bhutan	19	(1)
- * Club domestic league appearances and goals

Biren Basnet (born 20 October 1994) is a Bhutanese professional footballer, currently playing as a midfielder for Thimphu City in the Bhutan Premier League, and the Bhutan national football team.

== Club career ==
Basnet began his career at Druk Star, though given that they were not relegated from the A-Division in 2010 but did not partake in the 2011 season, it is unclear what level of football he was playing. He moved from Thimphu to Ugyen Academy in Punakha in 2012 and won the National League in 2013. Following the national title, he played in the 2014 AFC President's Cup, taking part in the 1–0 loss to Sri Lanka's Air Force SC, the 3–0 loss to Pakistan's KRL F.C. and the 4–0 loss to Bangladesh's Sheikh Russel KC.

== International career ==
He made his first appearance for the Bhutan national football team in 2012, in the 5–0 friendly defeat to Thailand. He next played for Bhutan in their 3–0 loss to Afghanistan in the 2013 SAFF Championship group stage. He was also an unused substitute in the other two group matches, the 8–2 loss to the Maldives and the 5–2 loss to Sri Lanka

== International goals ==
Scores and results list the Bhutan's goal tally first.

#	Date	Venue	Opponent	Score	Result	Competition
1.	8 October 2015	Changlimithang Stadium, Thimphu, Bhutan	Maldives	3–4	3–4	2018 FIFA World Cup qualification
