= Amdhan Ali =

Maldivian footballer

Personal information
- Date of birth: 11 September 1992 (age 34)
- Place of birth: Nolhivaram, Maldives
- Position: Defender

Team information
- Current team: Maziya
- Number: 4

Youth career
- 2012–2013: Maziya

Senior career*
Years	Team	Apps	(Gls)
2012–	Maziya	40+	(2+)
2013	→ Club Eagles (loan)	8	(0)

International career^{‡}
2012–2014	Maldives U23	3	(1)
2014–	Maldives	25	(1)
- * Club domestic league appearances and goals ‡ National team caps and goals as of 19 November 2019

Amdhan Ali (born 11 September 1992), known as Andy is a Maldivian international footballer who plays as a defender for Maldivian club Maziya.

== International career ==
Amdhan made his debut in an international friendly against Laos on 13 May 2014, in which he played the full 90 minutes and Maldives went on to win the game by a 7–1 score.
