= Afghanistan national football team results =

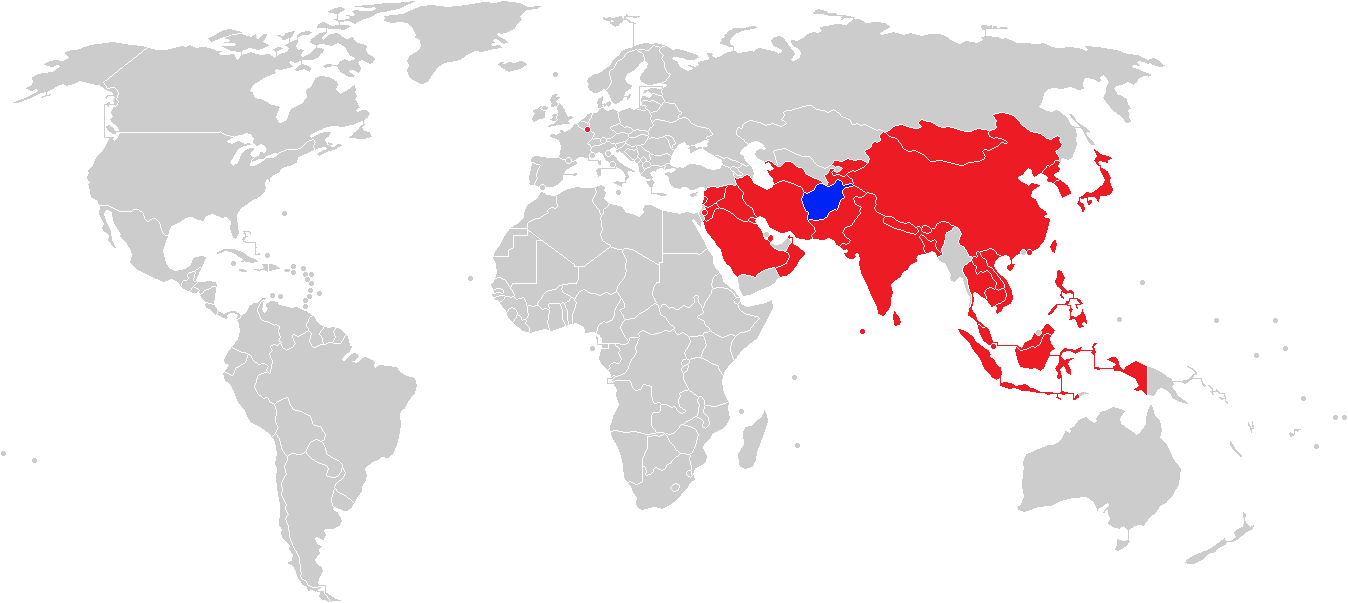
Afghanistan national football team all opponents

This page details the match results and statistics of the Afghanistan national football team.

== Key ==
Key to matches

- Att.=Match attendance
- (H)=Home ground
- (A)=Away ground
- (N)=Neutral ground

Key to record by opponent

- Pld=Games played
- W=Games won
- D=Games drawn
- L=Games lost
- GF=Goals for
- GA=Goals against

== Results ==
Afghanistan's score is shown first in each case.

=== 1941 ===
Date	Venue	Opponents	Score	Competition	Afghanistan scorers	Att.	Ref.
24 August 1941	Ghazi Stadium, Kabul (H)	Iran	0–0	Friendly		10,000	

=== 1948 ===
Date	Venue	Opponents	Score	Competition	Afghanistan scorers	Att.	Ref.
3 June 1948	India (A)	India	0–4	Friendly	Unknown	—	
26 July 1948	Goldstone Ground, Brighton (N)	Luxembourg	0–6	1948 Summer Olympics		5,000	

=== 1950 ===
Date	Venue	Opponents	Score	Competition	Afghanistan scorers	Att.	Ref.
26 October 1950	Amjadieh Stadium, Tehran, (A)	Iran	0–4	Friendly		—	

=== 1951 ===
Date	Venue	Opponents	Score	Competition	Afghanistan scorers	Att.	Ref.
7 March 1951	National Stadium, New Delhi (N)	India	0–3	1951 Asian Games		—	
9 March 1951	National Stadium, New Delhi (N)	Japan	0–2	1951 Asian Games		—	

=== 1954 ===
Date	Venue	Opponents	Score	Competition	Afghanistan scorers	Att.	Ref.
4 May 1954	Rizal Memorial Stadium, Manila (N)	South Korea	2–8	1954 Asian Games	Unknown	—	
6 May 1954	Rizal Memorial Stadium, Manila (N)	Hong Kong	2–4	1954 Asian Games	Unknown	—	

=== 1959 ===
Date	Venue	Opponents	Score	Competition	Afghanistan scorers	Att.	Ref.
27 August 1959	Ghazi Stadium, Kabul (H)	India	2–5	1960 Summer Olympics qualification	Ayubi, Mosa	—	
December 1959	(A)	India	w/o	1960 Summer Olympics qualification		—	

=== 1975 ===
Date	Venue	Opponents	Score	Competition	Afghanistan scorers	Att.	Ref.
21 November 1975	Al-Shaab Stadium, Baghdad (N)	Saudi Arabia	0–2	1976 AFC Asian Cup qualification		—	
23 November 1975	Al-Shaab Stadium, Baghdad (N)	Iraq	1–3	1976 AFC Asian Cup qualification	Unknown	—	
25 November 1975	Al-Shaab Stadium, Baghdad (N)	Qatar	1–2	1976 AFC Asian Cup qualification	Unknown	—	
28 November 1975	Al-Shaab Stadium, Baghdad (N)	Saudi Arabia	0–6	1976 AFC Asian Cup qualification		—	
30 November 1975	Al-Shaab Stadium, Baghdad (N)	Iraq	0–4	1976 AFC Asian Cup qualification		—	
2 December 1975	Al-Shaab Stadium, Baghdad (N)	Qatar	1–1	1976 AFC Asian Cup qualification	Unknown	—	

=== 1976 ===
Date	Venue	Opponents	Score	Competition	Afghanistan scorers	Att.	Ref.
19 July 1976	Ghazi Stadium, Kabul (H)	Pakistan	1–0	Afghanistan Republic Day Festival Cup	Saber	—	
24 July 1976	Ghazi Stadium, Kabul (H)	India	1–1	Afghanistan Republic Day Festival Cup	Unknown	—	
12 October 1976	Hockey Club of Pakistan, Karachi (A)	Pakistan	0–1	1976 Quaid-e-Azam International Tournament		—	

=== 1977 ===
Date	Venue	Opponents	Score	Competition	Afghanistan scorers	Att.	Ref.
24 July 1977	Ghazi Stadium, Kabul (H)	India	0–3	Afghanistan Republic Day Festival Cup		—	

=== 1979 ===
Date	Venue	Opponents	Score	Competition	Afghanistan scorers	Att.	Ref.
1 March 1979	Dhaka Stadium, Dhaka (N)	Bangladesh	2–2	1980 AFC Asian Cup qualification	Safdari, Hashimi	—	
2 March 1979	Dhaka Stadium, Dhaka (N)	Qatar	0–3	1980 AFC Asian Cup qualification		—	
5 March 1979	Dhaka Stadium, Dhaka (N)	Bangladesh	2–3	1980 AFC Asian Cup qualification	Najibullah, Saber	—	
6 March 1979	Dhaka Stadium, Dhaka (N)	Qatar	0–3	1980 AFC Asian Cup qualification		—	

=== 1984 ===
Date	Venue	Opponents	Score	Competition	Afghanistan scorers	Att.	Ref.
17 February 1984	Kazma SC Stadium, Kuwait City (A)	Kuwait	0–1	Friendly		—	
19 February 1984	Kazma SC Stadium, Kuwait City (A)	Kuwait	0–2	Friendly		—	
10 September 1984	Yuexiushan Stadium, Guangzhou (N)	Qatar	0–8	1984 AFC Asian Cup qualification		—	
12 September 1984	Yuexiushan Stadium, Guangzhou (N)	China	0–6	1984 AFC Asian Cup qualification		—	
15 September 1984	Yuexiushan Stadium, Guangzhou (N)	Hong Kong	0–0	1984 AFC Asian Cup qualification		—	
20 September 1984	Yuexiushan Stadium, Guangzhou (N)	Jordan	1–6	1984 AFC Asian Cup qualification	Farooq	—	

=== 2003 ===
Date	Venue	Opponents	Score	Competition	Afghanistan scorers	Att.	Ref.
10 January 2003	Bangabandhu Stadium, Dhaka (N)	Sri Lanka	0–1	2003 SAFF Gold Cup		—	
12 January 2003	Bangabandhu Stadium, Dhaka (N)	India	0–4	2003 SAFF Gold Cup		—	
14 January 2003	Bangabandhu Stadium, Dhaka (N)	Pakistan	0–1	2003 SAFF Gold Cup		—	
16 March 2003	Dasharath Rangasala, Kathmandu (N)	Kyrgyzstan	2–1	2004 AFC Asian Cup qualification	Shah, Azami	1,000	
18 March 2003	Dasharath Rangasala, Kathmandu (N)	Nepal	0–4	2004 AFC Asian Cup qualification		—	
19 November 2003	Olympic Stadium, Ashgabat (A)	Turkmenistan	0–11	2006 FIFA World Cup qualification		12,000	
22 November 2003	National Stadium, Kabul (H)	Turkmenistan	0–2	2006 FIFA World Cup qualification		—	

=== 2005 ===
Date	Venue	Opponents	Score	Competition	Afghanistan scorers	Att.	Ref.
9 November 2005	Pamir Stadium, Dushanbe (A)	Tajikistan	0–4	Friendly		—	
7 December 2005	People's Football Stadium, Karachi (N)	Maldives	1–9	2005 SAFF Gold Cup	Maqsood	—	
9 December 2005	People's Football Stadium, Karachi (N)	Pakistan	0–1	2005 SAFF Gold Cup		—	
11 December 2005	People's Football Stadium, Karachi (N)	Sri Lanka	2–1	2005 SAFF Gold Cup	Qadami, Gullestani	—	

=== 2006 ===
Date	Venue	Opponents	Score	Competition	Afghanistan scorers	Att.	Ref.
3 April 2006	M. A. Aziz Stadium, Chittagong (N)	Chinese Taipei	2–2	2006 AFC Challenge Cup	Qadami (2)	2,500	
5 April 2006	M. A. Aziz Stadium, Chittagong (N)	Philippines	1–1	2006 AFC Challenge Cup	Maqsood	3,000	

=== 2007 ===
Date	Venue	Opponents	Score	Competition	Afghanistan scorers	Att.	Ref.
8 October 2007	Abbasiyyin Stadium, Damascus (A)	Syria	0–3	2010 FIFA World Cup qualification		3,000	
26 October 2007	Pamir Stadium, Dushanbe (H)	Syria	1–2	2010 FIFA World Cup qualification	Karimi	2,000	

=== 2008 ===
Date	Venue	Opponents	Score	Competition	Afghanistan scorers	Att.	Ref.
5 May 2008	Spartak Stadium, Bishkek (N)	Bangladesh	0–0	2008 AFC Challenge Cup qualification		3,000	
7 May 2008	Spartak Stadium, Bishkek (N)	Kyrgyzstan	1–0	2008 AFC Challenge Cup qualification	Yamrali	7,000	
4 June 2008	Sugathadasa Stadium, Colombo (N)	Sri Lanka	2–2	2008 SAFF Championship	Habib (2)	—	
6 June 2008	Sugathadasa Stadium, Colombo (N)	Bangladesh	2–2	2008 SAFF Championship	Yamrali, Hadid	—	
8 June 2008	Sugathadasa Stadium, Colombo (N)	Bhutan	1–3	2008 SAFF Championship	Habib	—	
30 July 2008	Gachibowli Athletic Stadium, Hyderabad (N)	India	0–1	2008 AFC Challenge Cup		300	
1 August 2008	Gachibowli Athletic Stadium, Hyderabad (N)	Turkmenistan	0–5	2008 AFC Challenge Cup		100	
3 August 2008	Gachibowli Athletic Stadium, Hyderabad (N)	Tajikistan	0–4	2008 AFC Challenge Cup		150	
17 October 2008	Petaling Jaya Stadium, Petaling Jaya (N)	Nepal	2–2	2008 Merdeka Tournament	Barakzai, Azimi	—	
20 October 2008	Petaling Jaya Stadium, Petaling Jaya (N)	Malaysia	0–6	2008 Merdeka Tournament		3,000	

=== 2009 ===
Date	Venue	Opponents	Score	Competition	Afghanistan scorers	Att.	Ref.
7 December 2009	Bangabandhu National Stadium, Dhaka (N)	Maldives	1–3	2009 SAFF Championship	Barakzai	—	
9 December 2009	Bangabandhu National Stadium, Dhaka (N)	Nepal	0–3	2009 SAFF Championship		—	

=== 2010 ===
Date	Venue	Opponents	Score	Competition	Afghanistan scorers	Att.	Ref.
17 November 2010	Central Republican Stadium, Dushanbe (A)	Tajikistan	0–1	Friendly		—	

=== 2011 ===
Date	Venue	Opponents	Score	Competition	Afghanistan scorers	Att.	Ref.
23 March 2011	Tau Devi Lal Stadium, Gurgaon (N)	Bhutan	3–0	2012 AFC Challenge Cup qualification	Walizada (3)	200	
25 March 2011	Tau Devi Lal Stadium, Gurgaon (N)	Bhutan	2–0	2012 AFC Challenge Cup qualification	Nadeem, Kohistani	2,000	
7 April 2011	Dasharath Rangasala, Kathmandu (N)	Nepal	0–1	2012 AFC Challenge Cup qualification		9,100	
9 April 2011	Halchowk Stadium, Kathmandu (N)	Sri Lanka	1–0	2012 AFC Challenge Cup qualification	Hadid	1,800	
11 April 2011	Halchowk Stadium, Kathmandu (N)	North Korea	0–2	2012 AFC Challenge Cup qualification		1,000	
29 June 2011	Metallurg Stadium, Tursunzoda (H)	Palestine	0–2	2014 FIFA World Cup qualification		5,000	
3 July 2011	Faisal Al-Husseini International Stadium, Al-Ram (A)	Palestine	1–1	2014 FIFA World Cup qualification	Arezou	9,000	
3 December 2011	Jawaharlal Nehru Stadium, New Delhi (N)	India	1–1	2011 SAFF Championship	Arezou	—	
5 December 2011	Jawaharlal Nehru Stadium, New Delhi (N)	Sri Lanka	3–1	2011 SAFF Championship	Ahmadi (2), Yamrali	—	
7 December 2011	Jawaharlal Nehru Stadium, New Delhi (N)	Bhutan	8–1	2011 SAFF Championship	Yamrali, Z. I. Amiri, Arezou (4), Sharityar, Mashriqi	—	
9 December 2011	Jawaharlal Nehru Stadium, New Delhi (N)	Nepal	1–0 (a.e.t.)	2011 SAFF Championship	Arezou	—	
11 December 2011	Jawaharlal Nehru Stadium, New Delhi (N)	India	0–4	2011 SAFF Championship		—	

=== 2013 ===
Date	Venue	Opponents	Score	Competition	Afghanistan scorers	Att.	Ref.
2 March 2013	New Laos National Stadium, Vientiane (N)	Sri Lanka	1–0	2014 AFC Challenge Cup qualification	Arezou	200	
4 March 2013	New Laos National Stadium, Vientiane (N)	Mongolia	1–0	2014 AFC Challenge Cup qualification	Arezou	500	
6 March 2013	New Laos National Stadium, Vientiane (N)	Laos	1–1	2014 AFC Challenge Cup qualification	Ahmadi	3,000	
4 June 2013	Central Republican Stadium, Dushanbe (A)	Tajikistan	2–3	Friendly	Barakzai, Karimi	—	
20 August 2013	Afghanistan Football Federation Stadium, Kabul (H)	Pakistan	3–0	Friendly	Ahmadi, Hatifi, Jamhour	5,000	
2 September 2013	Halchowk Stadium, Kathmandu (N)	Bhutan	3–0	2013 SAFF Championship	Z. I. Amiri, Azadzoy, Barakzai	—	
4 September 2013	Halchowk Stadium, Kathmandu (N)	Sri Lanka	3–1	2013 SAFF Championship	Rafi, Z. I. Amiri, Barakzai	—	
6 September 2013	Dasharath Rangasala, Kathmandu (N)	Maldives	0–0	2013 SAFF Championship		—	
8 September 2013	Dasharath Rangasala, Kathmandu (N)	Nepal	1–0	2013 SAFF Championship	Ahmadi	—	
11 September 2013	Dasharath Rangasala, Kathmandu (N)	India	2–0	2013 SAFF Championship	Azadzoy, Ahmadi	6,500+	

=== 2014 ===
Date	Venue	Opponents	Score	Competition	Afghanistan scorers	Att.	Ref.
13 April 2014	Maktoum bin Rashid Al Maktoum Stadium, Dubai (N)	Kyrgyzstan	0–0	Friendly		—	
4 May 2014	Central Republican Stadium, Dushanbe (A)	Tajikistan	0–1	Friendly		—	
12 May 2014	Al Kuwait Sports Club Stadium, Kuwait City (N)	Kyrgyzstan	1–0	Friendly	Mashriqi	—	
14 May 2014	Al Kuwait Sports Club Stadium, Kuwait City (N)	Kuwait	2–3	Friendly	Z. I. Amiri, Shayesteh	1,000	
20 May 2014	Addu Football Stadium, Addu City (N)	Philippines	0–0	2014 AFC Challenge Cup		500	
22 May 2014	Addu Football Stadium, Addu City (N)	Turkmenistan	3–1	2014 AFC Challenge Cup	Z. I. Amiri, Hatifi, Shayesteh	1,500	
24 May 2014	Addu Football Stadium, Addu City (N)	Laos	0–0	2014 AFC Challenge Cup		600	
27 May 2014	National Football Stadium, Malé (N)	Palestine	0–2	2014 AFC Challenge Cup		500	
29 May 2014	National Football Stadium, Malé (N)	Maldives	1–1 (a.e.t.) (7–8p)	2014 AFC Challenge Cup	Karimi	6,500	

=== 2015 ===
Date	Venue	Opponents	Score	Competition	Afghanistan scorers	Att.	Ref.
6 February 2015	Punjab Stadium, Lahore (A)	Pakistan	1–2	Friendly	Sharifi	—	
29 May 2015	New Laos National Stadium, Vientiane (A)	Laos	2–0	Friendly	Shayesteh, Isoufi	—	
2 June 2015	Bangabandhu National Stadium, Dhaka (A)	Bangladesh	1–1	Friendly	Shanwary	—	
11 June 2015	Samen Stadium, Mashhad (H)	Syria	0–6	2018 FIFA World Cup qualification		7,647	
16 June 2015	Olympic Stadium, Phnom Penh (A)	Cambodia	1–0	2018 FIFA World Cup qualification	Zazai	55,000	
3 September 2015	Rajamangala Stadium, Bangkok (A)	Thailand	0–2	Friendly		—	
8 September 2015	Azadi Stadium, Tehran (H)	Japan	0–6	2018 FIFA World Cup qualification		8,650	
8 October 2015	National Stadium, Singapore (A)	Singapore	0–1	2018 FIFA World Cup qualification		5,400	
13 October 2015	Al-Seeb Stadium, Seeb (A)	Syria	2–5	2018 FIFA World Cup qualification	N. Amiri, Shayesteh	200	
12 November 2015	Takhti Stadium, Tehran (H)	Cambodia	3–0	2018 FIFA World Cup qualification	Zazai, N. Amiri, Amani	2,585	
24 December 2015	Trivandrum International Stadium, Thiruvananthapuram (N)	Bangladesh	4–0	2015 SAFF Championship	Saighani, Shayesteh, Z. Amiri, Amani	150	
26 December 2015	Trivandrum International Stadium, Thiruvananthapuram (N)	Bhutan	3–0	2015 SAFF Championship	Amani (2), Saighani	1,817	
28 December 2015	Trivandrum International Stadium, Thiruvananthapuram (N)	Maldives	4–1	2015 SAFF Championship	Shayesteh, Popalzay (2), Hatifi	1,751	
31 December 2015	Trivandrum International Stadium, Thiruvananthapuram (N)	Sri Lanka	5–0	2015 SAFF Championship	Hashemi, Taher, Amani, Hatifi, Shayesteh	300	

=== 2016 ===
Date	Venue	Opponents	Score	Competition	Afghanistan scorers	Att.	Ref.
3 January 2016	Trivandrum International Stadium, Thiruvananthapuram (N)	India	1–2 (a.e.t.)	2015 SAFF Championship	Z. Amiri	40,500	
24 March 2016	Saitama Stadium, Saitama (A)	Japan	0–5	2018 FIFA World Cup qualification		48,967	
29 March 2016	Takhti Stadium, Tehran (H)	Singapore	2–1	2018 FIFA World Cup qualification	Amani, Shirdel	24,500	
5 September 2016	Beirut Municipal Stadium, Beirut (A)	Lebanon	0–2	Friendly		500	
11 October 2016	Shah Alam Stadium, Shah Alam (A)	Malaysia	1–1	Friendly	N. Amiri	—	
13 November 2016	Central Republican Stadium, Dushanbe (A)	Tajikistan	0–1	Friendly		13,000	

=== 2017 ===
Date	Venue	Opponents	Score	Competition	Afghanistan scorers	Att.	Ref.
23 March 2017	Saoud bin Abdulrahman Stadium, Al Wakrah (N)	Singapore	2–1	Friendly	Mukhammad, Azadzoy	200	
28 March 2017	Central Republican Stadium, Dushanbe (H)	Vietnam	1–1	2019 AFC Asian Cup qualification	Amin	2,500	
6 June 2017	Rashid Stadium, Dubai (N)	Maldives	2–1	Friendly	Amin, Popalzay	300	
13 June 2017	Olympic Stadium, Phnom Penh (A)	Cambodia	0–1	2019 AFC Asian Cup qualification		40,000	
30 August 2017	Sultan Qaboos Sports Complex, Muscat (A)	Oman	0–2	Friendly		—	
5 September 2017	King Abdullah II Stadium, Amman (A)	Jordan	1–4	2019 AFC Asian Cup qualification	Z. Amiri	1,036	
10 October 2017	Central Republican Stadium, Dushanbe (H)	Jordan	3–3	2019 AFC Asian Cup qualification	Al-Souliman (o.g.), Z. I. Amiri, Amani	1,500	
14 November 2017	Mỹ Đình National Stadium, Hanoi (A)	Vietnam	0–0	2019 AFC Asian Cup qualification		28,580	

=== 2018 ===
Date	Venue	Opponents	Score	Competition	Afghanistan scorers	Att.	Ref.
27 March 2018	Central Republican Stadium, Dushanbe (H)	Cambodia	2–1	2019 AFC Asian Cup qualification	Sharza (2)	3,011	
19 August 2018	Afghanistan Football Federation Stadium, Kabul (H)	Palestine	0–0	Friendly		12,000	
25 December 2018	Miracle Resort Hotel Training Center, Antalya (N)	Turkmenistan	0–2	Friendly		150	
28 December 2018	Miracle Resort Hotel Training Center, Antalya (N)	Turkmenistan	2–2	Friendly	Shayesteh, Mukhammad	—	

=== 2019 ===
Date	Venue	Opponents	Score	Competition	Afghanistan scorers	Att.	Ref.
20 March 2019	Bukit Jalil National Stadium, Kuala Lumpur (N)	Oman	0–5	2019 Airmarine Cup		—	
23 March 2019	Bukit Jalil National Stadium, Kuala Lumpur (N)	Malaysia	1–2	2019 Airmarine Cup	Shayesteh	—	
7 June 2019	Central Republican Stadium, Dushanbe (A)	Tajikistan	1–1	Friendly	Haydary	—	
5 September 2019	Jassim bin Hamad Stadium, Doha (A)	Qatar	0–6	2022 FIFA World Cup qualification		10,950	
10 September 2019	Central Republican Stadium, Dushanbe (H)	Bangladesh	1–0	2022 FIFA World Cup qualification	Noor	5,000	
10 October 2019	Al-Seeb Stadium, Seeb (A)	Oman	0–3	2022 FIFA World Cup qualification		10,000	
14 November 2019	Central Republican Stadium, Dushanbe (H)	India	1–1	2022 FIFA World Cup qualification	Nazary	8,100	
19 November 2019	Central Republican Stadium, Dushanbe (H)	Qatar	0–1	2022 FIFA World Cup qualification		6,000	

=== 2021 ===
Date	Venue	Opponents	Score	Competition	Afghanistan scorers	Att.	Ref.
25 May 2021	Jebel Ali Centre of Excellence, Dubai (N)	Indonesia	3–2	Friendly	N. Amiri, Sharifi, Zamani	—	
29 May 2021	Jebel Ali Centre of Excellence, Dubai (N)	Singapore	1–1	Friendly	Z. Amiri	—	
3 June 2021	Jassim bin Hamad Stadium, Doha (N)	Bangladesh	1–1	2022 World Cup qualification	Sharifi	300	
11 June 2021	Jassim bin Hamad Stadium, Doha (N)	Oman	1–2	2022 World Cup qualification	Popalzay	183	
15 June 2021	Jassim bin Hamad Stadium, Doha (N)	India	1–1	2022 World Cup qualification	Zamani	603	
16 November 2021	Gloria Sports Arena, Antalya (N)	Indonesia	1–0	Friendly	Popalzay	—	

=== 2022 ===
Date	Venue	Opponents	Score	Competition	Afghanistan scorers	Att.	Ref.
1 June 2022	Thống Nhất Stadium, Ho Chi Minh City (A)	Vietnam	0–2	Friendly		—	
8 June 2022	Vivekananda Yuba Bharati Krirangan, Bidhannagar (N)	Hong Kong	1–2	2023 AFC Asian Cup qualification	Noor	1,115	
11 June 2022	Vivekananda Yuba Bharati Krirangan, Bidhannagar (N)	India	1–2	2023 AFC Asian Cup qualification	Z. Amiri	44,216	
15 June 2022	Vivekananda Yuba Bharati Krirangan, Bidhannagar (N)	Cambodia	2–2	2023 AFC Asian Cup qualification	Shayesteh, Zazai	982	

=== 2023 ===
Date	Venue	Opponents	Score	Competition	Afghanistan scorers	Att.	Ref.
10 June 2023	Dolen Omurzakov Stadium, Bishkek (N)	Kyrgyzstan	0–3	2023 CAFA Nations Cup		8,876	
13 June 2023	Dolen Omurzakov Stadium, Bishkek (N)	Iran	1–6	2023 CAFA Nations Cup	Noor	33	
3 September 2023	Bashundhara Kings Arena, Dhaka (A)	Bangladesh	0–0	Friendly		—	
7 September 2023	Bashundhara Kings Arena, Dhaka (A)	Bangladesh	1–1	Friendly	Sharza	—	
12 September 2023	Rizal Memorial Stadium, Manila (A)	Philippines	1–2	Friendly	Popalzay	—	
12 October 2023	Central Republican Stadium, Dushanbe (H)	Mongolia	1–0	2026 FIFA World Cup qualification	Sharza	1,456	
17 October 2023	MFF Football Centre, Ulaanbaatar (A)	Mongolia	1–0	2026 FIFA World Cup qualification	Noor	2,185	
16 November 2023	Khalifa International Stadium, Al Rayyan (A)	Qatar	1–8	2026 FIFA World Cup qualification	Sharifi	19,374	
21 November 2023	Al-Ettifaq Club Stadium, Khobar (H)	Kuwait	0–4	2026 FIFA World Cup qualification		330	

=== 2024 ===
Date	Venue	Opponents	Score	Competition	Afghanistan scorers	Att.	Ref.
21 March 2024	Damac Club Stadium, Khamis Mushait (H)	India	0–0	2026 FIFA World Cup qualification		3,900	
26 March 2024	Indira Gandhi Athletic Stadium, Guwahati (A)	India	2–1	2026 FIFA World Cup qualification	Akbari, Sharif Mukhammad	8,932	
5 June 2024	Prince Abdullah bin Jalawi Stadium, Hofuf (H)	Qatar	0–0	2026 FIFA World Cup qualification		651	
10 June 2024	Sabah Al Salem Stadium, Kuwait City (A)	Kuwait	0–1	2026 FIFA World Cup qualification		330	
16 November 2024	Central Republican Stadium, Dushanbe (N)	Nepal	0–2	Friendly		—	
19 November 2024	Central Republican Stadium, Dushanbe (A)	Tajikistan	1–3	Friendly	Asekzai	—	

=== 2025 ===
Date	Venue	Opponents	Score	Competition	Afghanistan scorers	Att.	Ref.
21 March 2025	Rajamangala Stadium, Bangkok (A)	Thailand	0–2	Friendly		10,219	
25 March 2025	Thuwunna Stadium, Yangon (A)	Myanmar	1–2	2027 Asian Cup qualification	Popalzay	6,500	
10 June 2025	Prince Abdullah bin Jalawi Sport City, Hofuf (H)	Syria	0–1	2027 Asian Cup qualification		532	
29 August 2025	Hisor Central Stadium, Hisor (N)	Iran	1–3	2025 CAFA Nations Cup	Musawi	4,520	
1 September 2025	Hisor Central Stadium, Hisor (A)	Tajikistan	0–2	2025 CAFA Nations Cup		—	
4 September 2025	Hisor Central Stadium, Hisor (N)	India	0–0	2025 CAFA Nations Cup		—	
9 October 2025	Jinnah Sports Stadium, Islamabad (A)	Pakistan	0–0	2027 Asian Cup qualification		7,375	
14 October 2025	Ali Al-Salem Al-Sabah Stadium, Farwaniya (H)	Pakistan	1–1	2027 Asian Cup qualification	Hanifi	750	

=== 2026 ===
Date	Venue	Opponents	Score	Competition	Afghanistan scorers	Att.	Ref.
26 March 2026	Thuwunna Stadium, Yangon (H)	Myanmar	1–2	2027 Asian Cup qualification	Popalzay	1,760	
31 March 2026	Prince Abdullah Al-Faisal Sports City Stadium, Jeddah (A)	Syria	1–5	2027 Asian Cup qualification	Panahi	562	
1 June 2026	National Football Stadium, Malé (A)	Maldives	1–0	Diamond Jubilee Tournament	Fazi	1,028	
7 June 2026	National Football Stadium, Malé (A)	Pakistan	0–2	Diamond Jubilee Tournament		450	
10 June 2026	National Football Stadium, Malé (A)	Pakistan	0–2	Diamond Jubilee Tournament		273	

== Notes ==
1. A: Afghanistan withdrew before the second leg against India.
2. B: Due to security concerns, Afghanistan played their home match during qualifying for the 2010 FIFA World Cup in Dushanbe, Tajikistan.
3. C: Due to security concerns, Afghanistan played their home match during qualifying for the 2014 FIFA World Cup in Tursunzoda, Tajikistan.
4. D: Due to security concerns, Afghanistan played their home matches during qualifying for the 2018 FIFA World Cup in Mashhad and Tehran, Iran.
5. E: Due to security concerns, Syria played their home matches during qualifying for the 2018 FIFA World Cup in Muscat and Seeb, Oman.
6. F: Due to security concerns, Afghanistan played their home matches during qualifying for the 2019 AFC Asian Cup in Dushanbe, Tajikistan.
7. G: Due to security concerns, Afghanistan played their home matches during qualifying for the 2022 FIFA World Cup in Dushanbe, Tajikistan.
8. H: Matches originally scheduled to be played in March and June 2020 were postponed and held in a central location due to the COVID-19 pandemic in Asia. As a result, Afghanistan's home match against Oman and their away matches against Bangladesh and India were played at a neutral venue in Doha, Qatar.
9. I: The match was abandoned in the 97th minute with Kyrgyzstan leading 1–0 after Afghanistan walked off and refused to continue. The match was awarded 3–0 to Kyrgyzstan.
10. J: Due to security concerns, Afghanistan played their home matches during qualifying for the 2026 FIFA World Cup in Dushanbe, Tajikistan, Khobar, Khamis Mushait and Hofuf, Saudi Arabia.
11. K: Due to security concerns, Afghanistan are playing their home matches during qualifying for the 2027 AFC Asian Cup in neutral venues.
12. L: Due to security concerns, Syria are playing their home matches during qualifying for the 2027 AFC Asian Cup in neutral venues.

== Record by opponent ==
As of match played 10 June 2026

Team	Pld	W	D	L	GF	GA	GD	WPCT
Bangladesh	10	2	7	1	14	10	+4	20.00
Bhutan	6	5	0	1	20	4	+16	83.33
Cambodia	5	3	1	1	8	4	+4	60.00
China	1	0	0	1	0	6	−6	0.00
Chinese Taipei	1	0	1	0	2	2	0	0.00
Hong Kong	3	0	1	2	3	6	−3	0.00
India	14	2	5	7	11	25	−14	14.29
Indonesia	2	2	0	0	4	2	+2	100.00
Iran	4	0	1	3	2	13	−11	0.00
Iraq	2	0	0	2	1	7	−6	0.00
Japan	3	0	0	3	0	13	−13	0.00
Jordan	3	0	1	2	5	13	−8	0.00
Kuwait	3	0	0	3	2	8	−6	0.00
Kyrgyzstan	5	3	1	1	4	4	0	60.00
Laos	3	1	2	0	3	1	+2	33.33
Lebanon	1	0	0	1	0	2	−2	0.00
Luxembourg	1	0	0	1	0	6	−6	0.00
Malaysia	3	0	1	2	2	9	−7	0.00
Maldives	7	3	2	2	10	15	−5	42.86
Mongolia	3	3	0	0	3	0	+3	100.00
Myanmar	2	0	0	2	2	4	−2	0.00
Nepal	7	2	1	4	4	12	−8	28.57
Oman	4	0	0	4	1	12	−11	0.00
North Korea	1	0	0	1	0	2	−2	0.00
Pakistan	8	1	2	5	5	9	−4	12.50
Palestine	4	0	2	2	1	5	−4	0.00
Philippines	3	0	2	1	2	3	−1	0.00
Qatar	9	0	2	7	3	32	−29	0.00
Saudi Arabia	2	0	0	2	0	8	−8	0.00
Singapore	4	2	1	1	5	4	+1	50.00
South Korea	1	0	0	1	2	8	−6	0.00
Sri Lanka	8	6	1	1	17	6	+11	75.00
Syria	6	0	0	6	4	22	−18	0.00
Tajikistan	9	0	1	8	4	20	−16	0.00
Thailand	2	0	0	2	0	4	−4	0.00
Turkmenistan	6	1	1	4	5	23	−18	16.67
Vietnam	3	0	2	1	1	3	−2	0.00
Total	159	36	38	85	150	327	−177	22.64

Source: Results

== Records ==
=== Team records ===
- First international: Afghanistan 0–0 Iran (Kabul, Afghanistan; 25 August 1941).
- Biggest win: Bhutan 1–8 Afghanistan (New Delhi, India; 7 December 2011).
- Biggest defeat: Turkmenistan 11–0 Afghanistan (Ashgabat, Turkmenistan; 19 November 2003).

=== Biggest attendances (top 5) ===
1- 55,000 attendance. Won 1–0 vs Cambodia (Olympic Stadium, Phnom Penh, Cambodia during the 2018 FIFA World Cup qualification on 15 June 2016).

2- 48,967 attendance. Lost 0–5 vs Japan (Saitama Stadium, Saitama, Japan during the 2018 FIFA World Cup qualification on 24 March 2016).

3- 44,216 attendance. Lost 1–2 vs India (Vivekananda Yuba Bharati Krirangan, Bidhannagar, India during the 2023 AFC Asian Cup qualification on 11 June 2022).

4- 40,500 attendance. Lost 1–2 (a.e.t.) vs India (Trivandrum International Stadium, Thiruvananthapuram, India during the 2015 SAFF Championship final on 3 January 2016).

5- 40,000 attendance. Lost 0–1 vs Cambodia (Olympic Stadium, Phnom Penh, Cambodia during the 2019 AFC Asian Cup qualification on 13 June 2017).
