= 2015 SAFF Championship final =

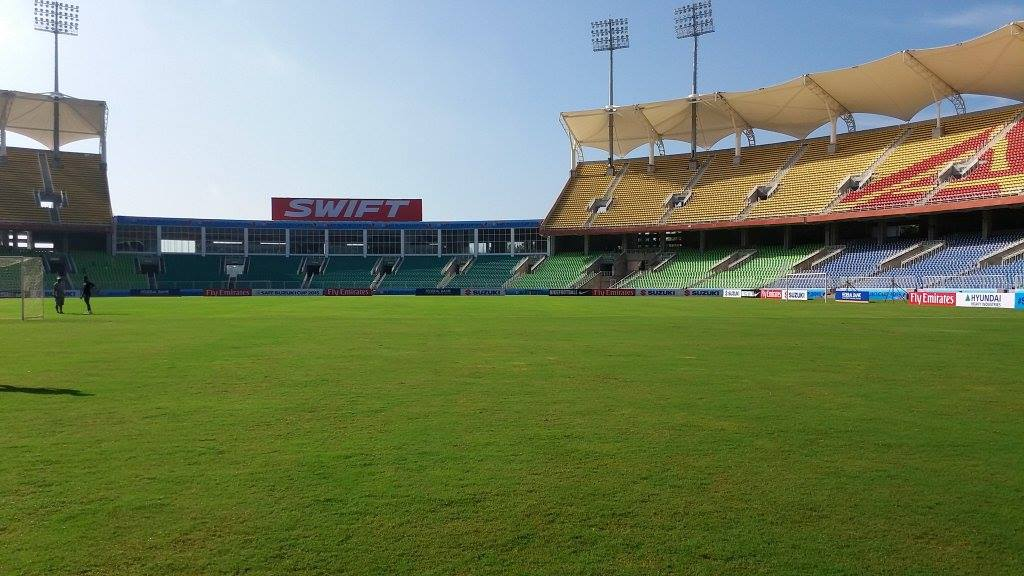
- Greenfield Stadium hosted the final
- Event: 2015 SAFF Championship
India	Afghanistan
	(Afghanistan)
2	1
- After extra time
- Date: 3 January 2016
- Venue: Trivandrum International Stadium, Thiruvananthapuram
- Referee: Hiroyuki Kimura (Japan)
- Attendance: 40,500

The 2015 SAFF Championship final was a football match that took place on 3 January 2016 at the Trivandrum International Stadium in Thiruvananthapuram, India, to determine the 2015 SAFF Championship winner. India defeated Afghanistan 2–1 in the extra time to win their seventh title after the match ended 1–1 in regular time.

== Venue ==
On 2 July 2015, it was announced that the matches during the tournament, including the final, would take place at the newly constructed Trivandrum International Stadium in Thiruvananthapuram, Kerala.

Thiruvananthapuram
Trivandrum International Stadium
Capacity: 50,000
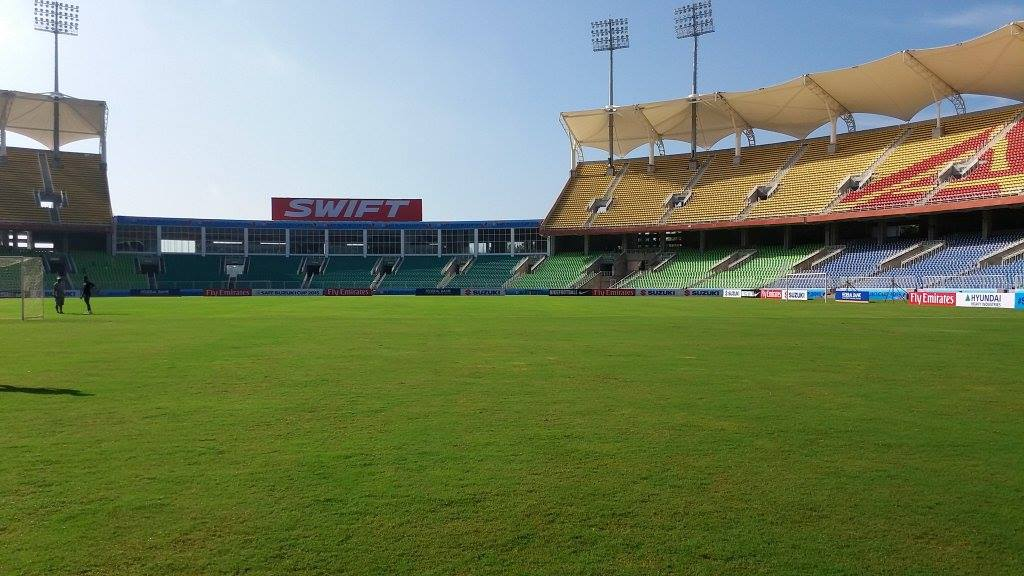

== Route to the final ==
Heading into the tournament, Afghanistan were the defending champions of the tournament, with it also being the last time they can officially take part, as they have become members of the newly formed Central Asian Football Association. In the group stage matches they defeated Bangladesh 4–0, Bhutan 3–0 and Maldives 4–1. In the semi-final Afghans demolished Sri Lanka 5–0 to enter their third consecutive final.

On the other hand, hosts India defeated the Lankans 2–0, followed by a 4–1 win over Nepal. They went on to play the semi-final against Maldives and defeated them 3–2.

Afghanistan
Round
India
Opponent
Result
Group stage
Opponent
Result
Bangladesh
4–0
Match 1
Sri Lanka
2–0
Bhutan
3–0
Match 2
Nepal
4–1
Maldives
4–1
Match 3

Team	Pld	W	D	L	GF	GA	GD	Pts
Afghanistan	3	3	0	0	11	1	+10	9
Maldives	3	2	0	1	7	6	+1	6
Bangladesh	3	1	0	2	4	6	−3	3
Bhutan	3	0	0	3	1	9	−8	0

Final standing

Team	Pld	W	D	L	GF	GA	GD	Pts
India	2	2	0	0	6	1	+5	6
Sri Lanka	2	0	0	1	1	2	–1	3
Nepal	2	0	0	2	1	5	−4	0

Opponent
Result
Knockout phase
Opponent
Result
Sri Lanka
5–0
Semi-finals
Maldives
3–2

== Match ==
3 January 2016
18:30 IST

India	2–1 (a.e.t.)	Afghanistan
Lalpekhlua 72'; Chhetri 101'	SAFF	Amiri 70'

Trivandrum International Stadium, Thiruvananthapuram
Attendance: 40,500
Referee: Hiroyuki Kimura (Japan)

India	Afghanistan

GK	23	Gurpreet Singh Sandhu
RB	20	Pritam Kotal
CB	5	Arnab Mondal (substituted off) 117'
CB	3	Augustin Fernandes
LB	21	Narayan Das (yellow card) 77'
RM	19	Halicharan Narzary
CM	22	Rowllin Borges
CM	7	Eugeneson Lyngdoh (yellow card) 93' (substituted off) 96'
LM	10	Bikash Jairu (substituted off) 120'
CF	12	Jeje Lalpekhlua (yellow card) 32'
CF	11	Sunil Chhetri (c)
Substitutes:
CB	2	Aiborlang Khongjee (yellow card) 118' (substituted on) 117'
LM	46	Sanju Pradhan (substituted on) 120'
CM	14	Pronay Halder (substituted on) 96'
GK	16	Karanjit Singh
GK	1	Subrata Pal
DF	26	Koushik Sarkar
DF	24	Lalchhuanmawia
MF	43	Lallianzuala Chhangte
Manager:
(England) Stephen Constantine

GK	1	Ovays Azizi
RB	20	Mustafa Hadid
CB	5	Masih Saighani
CB	13	Sayed Mohammad Hashemi
LB	3	Hassan Amin (yellow card) 86'
CDM	2	Abassin Alikhil
CM	21	Kanischka Taher (yellow card) 45'
CAM	8	Faysal Shayesteh (c)
RW	7	Zubayr Amiri (substituted off) 106'
LW	11	Norlla Amiri (substituted off) 84'
CF	17	Mustafa Zazai (substituted off) 91'
Substitutes:
LW	19	Omid Popalzay (substituted on) 84'
RW	18	Ahmad Hatifi (yellow card) 120' (substituted on) 106'
CF	9	Khaibar Amani (substituted on) 91'
GK	22	Fardeen Kohistani
GK	16	Hamidullah Wakily
DF	4	Roholla Iqbalzadeh
MF	26	Omid Homauoni
DF	6	Anoush Dastgir
FW	42	Fardin Hakimi
Manager:
(Croatia) Petar Segrt

Match rules

- 90 minutes.
- 30 minutes of extra-time if necessary.
- Penalty shoot-out if scores still level.
- Eight named substitutes.
- Maximum of three substitutions.

== See also ==
- 2015 SAFF Championship
