= Mohamed Rifnas =

Sri Lankan footballer

Personal information
- Date of birth: 9 January 1995 (age 31)
- Place of birth: Maligawatte, Sri Lanka
- Height: 1.84 m (6 ft 0 in)
- Position: Midfielder

Team information
- Current team: Colombo FC
- Number: 7

Youth career
- Colombo FC

Senior career*
Years	Team	Apps	(Gls)
2014–2018	Renown Sports Club		
2018–	Colombo FC		

International career^{‡}
2014–	Sri Lanka	8	(2)
- * Club domestic league appearances and goals as of 8 April 2018 ‡ National team caps and goals as of 23 December 2015

Mohamed Rifnas (born 9 January 1995) is a Sri Lankan professional footballer who plays as a midfielder for Colombo FC in the Sri Lanka Football Premier League. He operates primarily as a central midfielder and is comfortable playing both in attack and defense.

== Career ==
Rifnas began his club career with Colombo FC in 2011 as a teenager & promoted the club from Division 1 to Champions League. After helping Colombo FC to the FA CUP finals, Renown Sports Club of the Sri Lanka Football Premier League made an effort to sign Rifnas's elder brother to the team. He made a midfield partnership with Fazul Rahman & his brother Rizni throughout the season, and earned two consecutive Golden Boot awards. On March 28, 2018, Rifnas officially transferred to his childhood club, Colombo FC, after rumors had been spread about his transfer.

== International ==
Rifnas made his debut for Sri Lanka on 26 August 2014 against Seychelles and scored his first goal for his country in the 78th minute. That goal proved to be the winning goal as Sri Lanka won 2–1. Rifnas was then selected to be part of Sri Lanka's side for the 2015 SAFF Championship, where he was named as one of the top young players to watch during the tournament. He scored the winning goal for Sri Lanka in their opening match of the tournament against Nepal in the fifth minute of stoppage time after the second half. Sri Lanka won 1–0.

=== International goals ===
Score and result list Sri Lanka's goal tally first.

#	Date	Venue	Opponent	Score	Result	Competition
1.	26 August 2014	Stade Linité, Victoria, Seychelles	Seychelles	2–1	2–1	Friendly
2.	23 December 2015	Trivandrum International Stadium, Kariavattom, India	Nepal	1–0	1–0	2015 SAFF Championship

== Career statistics ==
=== International ===
As of 23 December 2015

Sri Lanka national team
Year	Apps	Goals
2014	4	1
2015	4	2
Total	8	3
