= Rowllin Borges =

Indian footballer (born 1992)

Personal information
- Date of birth: 5 June 1992 (age 34)
- Place of birth: Nuvem, Goa, India
- Height: 1.83 m (6 ft 0 in)
- Position: Defensive midfielder

Team information
- Current team: Kerala Blasters
- Number: 22

Youth career
- 2006–2007: Fransa-Pax
- 2007–2009: Velsao Pale
- 2009–2011: Sporting Goa

Senior career*
Years	Team	Apps	(Gls)
2011–2016	Sporting Goa	58	(3)
2016–2019	NorthEast United	48	(4)
2017	→ East Bengal (loan)	12	(1)
2019–2024	Mumbai City	55	(4)
2023–2024	→ Goa (loan)	19	(3)
2024–2025	Goa	12	(0)
2026–	Kerala Blasters	5	(0)

International career^{‡}
2016	India U23	4	(0)
2015–2023	India	35	(2)
Medal record
Men's football
Representing India
SAFF Championship
Winner	2015 India
- * Club domestic league appearances and goals as of 16:42, 22 May 2026 (UTC) ‡ National team caps and goals as of 16:30, 18 June 2023

Rowllin Borges (born 5 June 1992) is an Indian professional footballer who plays as a midfielder for the Indian Super League club Kerala Blasters.

== Youth career ==
Borges began his youth career by joining the youth team of Fransa-Pax FC at the age of 14, from where he moved to Velsao Pale FC's academy after one year. He then moved to the academy of then I-League club, Sporting Clube de Goa.

== Club career ==
=== Sporting Goa ===
Borges began his career by signing with Sporting Clube de Goa in 2011, who used to play in I-League at that time. He made his debut for the club against Prayag United on 23 October 2011, which ended in a 2–2 draw in the 2011-12 I-League season.

Borges stayed at the club for the 2012-13 I-League season. He played his first match of the season for the club against East Bengal on 7 October 2012, which ended in a 0–0 draw. He ended his season goalless and played his last match of the season on 11 May 2013 against Mumbai FC that ended in a 2–2 draw.

Borges played his first match of the 2013-14 I-League season against Mumbai FC on 21 September 2013 in 1–1 draw. He scored his debut goal for the club against Mohun Bagan on 23 March 2014, which ended in a 1–3 defeat for Sporting, as Borges scored the only goal for them in the 78th minute. Borges scored his second of the season on 2 April in a 1–2 victory over Rangdajied United. He scored his third goal of the season in his last match of the season against Goan rivals Salgaocar FC on 15 April in a thrilling 3–3 draw.

After a decent season, he played his first match of the 2014-15 I-League season against East Bengal on 18 January 2015 in a 1–1 draw, and ended his season by playing against Pune FC on 30 May as a substitute for Mahmoud Amnah in a huge victory over Pune with a score of 4–0.

He stayed with Sporting for the 2015-16 I-League season, and played his first match of the season against DSK Shivajians FC on 17 January 2016, which ended in a 0–0 draw after the final whistle. Borges left the club after the 2015–16 season after making 59 appearances and scoring 3 goals along his time at Sporting Goa.

=== NorthEast United ===
On 25 May 2016, Indian Super League club NorthEast United FC announced the signing of Borges on a free transfer along with four other signings for the 2016 Indian Super League. He played his debut match for the club on 1 October in a 1–0 victory over Kerala Blasters FC. After the 2016 Indian Super League season, Borges was loaned to I-League club East Bengal. After his stint with East Bengal, Borges was retained by NorthEast United for the 2017–18 Indian Super League. He played his first match of the season against Delhi Dynamos (current Odisha FC) on 2 December 2017 which ended in a 0–2 defeat for Delhi.

Borges stayed at the club for the 2018–19 Indian Super League, and played his first match of the campaign against FC Goa on 1 October 2018, which ended in a 2–2 draw. He scored his debut goal for the club on 4 October in the next matchday against ATK in a 0–1 victory, where he scored the only goal of the day in the 89th minute of the match. He scored his second goal for the club against Chennaiyin FC in the high scoring match on 18 October, which ended in a 3–4 victory for them, as Borges scored the fourth goal for NorthEast in the 54th minute while the game was levelled, and helped them clinch the three points of the day. In that match, it was Borges who opened the scoresheet, as it was him who scored an own goal in the fourth minute and gave Chennaiyin an early lead.

He scored his third goal of the season against Mumbai City FC on 13 February 2019, where he scored the opening goal in the fourth minute of the match, that they won 0–2 at final whistle. Borges scored his last and fourth goal for NorthEast United on 20 February, when they drew against FC Pune City with a score of 1–1. After the 2018-19 ISL season, Borges left the club to join Mumbai City FC. He left after a remarkable season with four goal and two assists in his name, that helped NorthEast United to qualify for the semi-finals of the ISL for the first time in their history.

==== East Bengal (loan) ====
After his impressive 2016 ISL season, on 11 December 2016, Borges was loaned to East Bengal for the 2016-17 I-League season. He played his debut match for the club on 7 January 2017 against Aizawl FC in a 1–1 draw. Borges scored his debut goal for the club in the Kolkata Derby against Mohun Bagan on 9 April, where he scored the only goal for East Bengal in the injury time, which they lost 2–1 after the final whistle. He played his last match with East Bengal on 29 April in a 0–4 victory over Mumbai FC and left the club after finishing his loan term.

=== Mumbai City ===
On his 27th birthday, on 5 June 2019, it was announced that Mumbai City FC had secured Rowllin Borges on a three-year contract. He played his debut match for the club in the 2019–20 Indian Super League against Kerala Blasters FC in a 0–1 victory on 24 October 2019. Borges scored his debut goal for the club on 15 December in a 2–3 victory over Bengaluru FC, where he scored in the injury time while the game was going to a draw, hence helping Mumbai City to collect the three points. He scored his second goal of the season against FC Goa on 12 February 2020, which ended in a disastrous 5–2 defeat for Mumbai City even after the goal by Borges in the 19th minute of the game.

Borges played his first match of the 2020–21 Indian Super League on 21 November 2020 in a 1–0 defeat against his former club NorthEast United. Borges scored his first goal of the season against Odisha FC on 3 December, which Mumbai ended up winning 2–0. He scored his second goal of the season on 8 February 2021 against FC Goa in a thrilling match, which ended in a 3–3 draw. Mumbai ended their season as table toppers after a stellar season, which helped Borges to clinch his first ever trophy. Mumbai was qualified for the championship semi finals in process to meet FC Goa in both legs, which they went on to win in penalty shootout after the match ended 2–2 after full time and extra time in second leg. The deciding penalty was taken by Rowllin Borges, which he netted in, thereby taking Mumbai City FC to the final of the Indian Super League for the first time in their history.

Borges started in the final against ATK Mohun Bagan FC on 13 March 2021, which they won 2–1, thereby winning the ISL final for the first time, and this victory also helped Borges to win his second title in his career in the same season. On 5 June 2021, Borges signed a three-year contract extension with Mumbai City, lasting until 2024. He was later included in club's 2022 AFC Champions League squad.

==== FC Goa (loan) ====
On 11 June 2023, Borges joined FC Goa on a season-long loan.

=== Kerala Blasters ===
On 25 January 2026, Borges joined Kerala Blasters.

== International career ==
Borges had represented India in under-23 level, and in 2015, he was called for India's senior national team. Borges played his debut match for India as a substitute for Eugeneson Lyngdoh against Nepal on 31 August 2015, which ended in a 0–0 draw. He was included in the squad of India for the 2018 FIFA World Cup qualifiers, and played his first qualifying match for India on 8 September 2015 against Iran as a substitute for Dhanpal Ganesh, which they lost 0–3.

Borges was later included in the Indian squad to take part in the 2015 SAFF Championship. He scored his debut goal for the national team in that competition against Nepal on 27 December 2015 in the group stage match, which India won 4–1. Borges started in the final of the 2015 SAFF Championship on 3 January 2016 against reigning champions Afghanistan, which India won 2–1 after extra time, thereby Borges winning his first international trophy. As a result of his brilliant performance in the year 2016 for both club and country, Borges was awarded with the AIFF Emerging Player of the Year Award.

He was selected for the national team to play in the 2019 AFC Asian Cup qualifiers. Borges scored his second goal for the national team in the competition against Macau on 11 October 2017, where he opened the scoresheet of the game, as India won on a big margin of 4–1, thereby qualifying for the 2019 AFC Asian Cup.

He was in the squad for the 2018 Intercontinental Cup, and played in the final as a substitute for Halicharan Narzary against Kenya on 10 June 2018, which India won 2–0, thereby winning the first edition of the Intercontinental Cup. India qualified for the 2019 AFC Asian Cup after topping in their group of the qualifying stage.

Borges was called up by the national team for his first AFC Asian Cup tournament. He played in India's first match in the group stage against Thailand as a substitute in the 78th minute for Anirudh Thapa on 6 January 2019, which India won 1–4. This victory was India's first victory in an AFC Asian Cup match in 55 years, and was also their biggest win in an Asian Cup match in their history. He also played the last match in the group stage against Bahrain on 14 January, which India lost 0–1, resulting in their elimination for the campaign.

Borges then represented India in the 2022 FIFA World Cup qualifiers, and played his first match of the qualifiers against Oman on 9 September 2019 which ended in a 1–2 defeat for India. He also started in match against Qatar on 10 September, where India put on an extraordinary show, as India drew the Asia's reigning champions 0–0.

== Personal life ==
Rowlin Borges was born in Nuvem, Goa on 5 June 1992. He began playing football as a goalkeeper in school. His favorite footballers include Ronaldinho, Zinedine Zidane, Sunil Chhetri, and Climax Lawrence.

== Style of play ==
Borges is a brick in the midfield who claims the ball at any situation. His vision on the pitch allows him to minimize the threat in a simpler way. His former coach at NorthEast United, Eelco Schattorie compared him with the Manchester City midfielder Kevin De Bruyne by adding, "Rowllin Borges is bit like Kevin De Bruyne. When I see the quality, I can compare them a little bit; to play box to box, have good passing abilities, can assist, and score goals".

== Career statistics ==
=== Club ===
As of 19 April 2023

Club	Season	League			Cup		AFC		Total	
Club	Season	Division	Apps	Goals	Apps	Goals	Apps	Goals	Apps	Goals
Sporting Goa	2011–12	I-League	1	0	5 (Note: Appearance(s) in Federation Cup) (Note: Appearance(s) in Durand Cup)	0	—		6	0
Sporting Goa	2012–13	I-League	12	0	6	0	—		18	0
Sporting Goa	2013–14	I-League	21	3	5	0	—		26	3
Sporting Goa	2014–15	I-League	13	0	4	0	—		17	0
Sporting Goa	2015–16	I-League	12	0	8	0	—		20	0
Sporting Goa	Total		59	3	28	0	0	0	87	3
NorthEast United	2016	Indian Super League	13	0	0	0	—		13	0
NorthEast United	2017–18	Indian Super League	16	0	1 (Note: Appearance(s) in Super Cup)	0	—		17	0
NorthEast United	2018–19	Indian Super League	19	4	1	1	—		20	5
NorthEast United	Total		48	4	2	1	0	0	50	5
East Bengal (loan)	2016–17	I-League	12	1	4	0	—		16	1
Mumbai City	2019–20	Indian Super League	15	2	0	0	—		15	2
Mumbai City	2020–21	Indian Super League	20	2	0	0	—		20	2
Mumbai City	2021–22	Indian Super League	4	0	0	0	—		4	0
Mumbai City	2022–23	Indian Super League	16	0	4	0	1 (Note: Appearance(s) in Qualifier for AFC Champions League group stage)	0	21	0
Mumbai City	Total		55	4	4	0	1	0	60	4
Goa (loan)	2023–24	Indian Super League	0	0	0	0	—		0	0
Career total			174	12	36	1	1	0	211	13

=== International ===
As of 18 June 2023

National team	Year	Apps	Goals
India	2015	7	1
India	2016	4	0
India	2017	8	1
India	2018	7	0
India	2019	7	0
India	2021	1	0
India	2023	1	0
Total		35	2

==== International goals ====
Scores and results list India's goal tally first

No.	Date	Venue	Cap	Opponent	Score	Result	Competition	Ref.
1.	27 December 2015	Trivandrum International Stadium, Trivandrum, India	6	Nepal	1–1	4–1	2015 SAFF Championship	
2.	11 October 2017	Sree Kanteerava Stadium, Bengaluru, India	19	Macau	1–0	4–1	2019 AFC Asian Cup qualification	

== Honours ==
India

- SAFF Championship: 2015
- Tri-Nation Series: 2017
- Intercontinental Cup: 2018, 2023

India U23

- South Asian Games Silver medal: 2016

Mumbai City

- Indian Super League Championship: 2020–21
- Indian Super League Premiers: 2020–21

Individual

- AIFF Emerging Player of the Year: 2016
