= Augustin Fernandes =

Indian footballer (born 1988)

Personal information
- Full name: Augustin Melwyn Fernandes
- Date of birth: 13 October 1988 (age 38)
- Place of birth: Goa, India
- Height: 1.78 m (5 ft 10 in)
- Position: Centre back

Team information
- Current team: Sudeva Delhi FC
- Number: 31

Youth career
- Sesa Football Academy

Senior career*
Years	Team	Apps	(Gls)
2011–2016	Salgaocar	98	(8)
2015	→ Atlético de Kolkata (loan)	13	(1)
2016	→ Pune City (loan)	4	(0)
2017–2018	ATK	0	(0)
2019–2020	Jamshedpur	3	(1)
2020–	Sudeva Delhi FC	5	(0)

International career
2015–2016	India	7	(0)
- * Club domestic league appearances and goals as of 23:31, 8 May 2019 (UTC)

Augustin Melwyn Fernandes (born 13 October 1988) is an Indian professional footballer who plays as a centre back for Sudeva Delhi FC in the I-League.

== Career ==
Born in Goa, Fernandes began his career with the Sesa Football Academy before signing a professional contract with I-League side Salgaocar in 2011. During his first season with the club, Fernandes helped Salgaocar win the I-League and Federation Cup titles.

In 2015, Fernandes was part of the Indian Super League Draft where he was selected in the second round by Atlético de Kolkata. After spending the 2015 season with Atlético on loan, Fernandes decided to join Pune City on loan for the 2016 ISL season.

On 23 July 2017, Fernandes was selected in the 12th round of the 2017–18 ISL Players Draft by ATK for the 2017–18 Indian Super League. He was released by the club in January 2018 without making a single appearance for the side.

A year later, on 25 January 2019, Fernandes was signed by fellow Indian Super League club, Jamshedpur.

== International ==
Fernandes made his international senior debut for India on 12 November 2015 in a 2018 FIFA World Cup qualifier against Guam. He came on as a 91st-minute substitute as India won 1–0. On 3 January 2016, Fernandes was in the starting line-up as India defeated Afghanistan in the 2015 SAFF Championship Final.

== Honours ==
=== Club ===
Salgaocar

- I-League: 2010–11
- Federation Cup: 2011

=== International ===
India

- SAFF Championship: 2015
