= Zubayr Amiri =

Afghan footballer

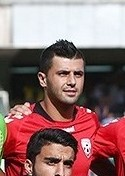
- Amiri with Afghanistan in 2015

Personal information
- Date of birth: 2 May 1990 (age 36)
- Place of birth: Kabul, Afghanistan
- Height: 1.85 m (6 ft 1 in)
- Position: Midfielder

Team information
- Current team: SC 1960 Hanau
- Number: 7

Youth career
- 1. FC 06 Langdiebach
- TSV Hanau
- Viktoria Aschaffenburg

Senior career*
Years	Team	Apps	(Gls)
2009–2010	Viktoria Aschaffenburg	28	(2)
2010–2011	Eintracht Frankfurt II	25	(1)
2011–2012	FC Bayern Alzenau	6	(0)
2012	Viktoria Aschaffenburg	4	(0)
2012–2014	FC Bayern Alzenau	50	(11)
2014–2022	SC Hessen Dreieich		
2022–2023	Eintracht Frankfurt II	37	(5)
2023–	SC 1960 Hanau		

International career^{‡}
2011–	Afghanistan	31	(4)
- * Club domestic league appearances and goals as of 23 May 2018 ‡ National team caps and goals as of 10:29, 7 April 2024 (UTC)

Zubayr Amiri (Dari: زبیر امیري; born 2 May 1990) is an Afghan professional footballer who plays for SC 1960 Hanau and the Afghanistan national team. Amiri operates as a midfielder, and can also play in a more attacking role; considered a versatile player because he is proficient with both feet. He has previously played for Viktoria Aschaffenburg and Eintracht Frankfurt II.

== Club career ==
Amiri was born in Kabul, Afghanistan. After playing youth football for 1.FC Langendiebach, TSV 1860 Hanau and Viktoria Aschaffenburg, he began his senior career at Viktoria Aschaffenburg in the 2009–10 season, in which the club competed in the Hessenliga. Amiri had a successful season, playing 28 of Viktoria's 36 games and also scoring twice. He left the club at the end of the season after they went into administration and were relegated, despite finishing in eighth place. Amiri then transferred to Eintracht Frankfurt II for the 2010–11 season.

Amiri made his debut for Frankfurt in a 3–2 loss to Hessen Kassel on 1 September 2010. In the midfielder's first season at the club, Frankfurt finished sixth in the Regionalliga Süd. Amiri featured in 24 of Frankfurt's 30 matches, scoring one goal. He also contributed eight assists, doubling the number of goals he created at Viktoria Aschaffenburg. His first goal for Frankfurt came in a 4–0 home win over 1860 Munich on 7 December 2010.

After being released by Eintracht Frankfurt, Amiri joined Regionalliga Süd club FC Bayern Alzenau in December 2011. He was given the number 11 shirt by the club. Later that month, Amiri helped Alzenau's under–23 side win the SV Heitzenröder-Silvestercup indoor football tournament. Amiri was the tournament's fourth–top scorer with 7 goals. The midfielder made his league debut for the club on 3 March 2012, coming on as a substitute for Patrick Amrhein in a 3–1 defeat to Stuttgarter Kickers. He went on to make five more appearances for the side. Amiri's last league appearance for Alzenau came in a 1–0 win over his former club Eintracht Frankfurt II on 29 April 2012.

Amiri rejoined former club Viktoria Aschaffenburg on 1 July 2012, but had to wait until 25 July for his first league appearance of the 2012–13 season, coming on as a substitute for defender Fnan Tewelde in a 5–0 loss at SV Seligenporten. However, less than two months after signing for Aschaffenburg, Amiri's contract was cancelled by mutual agreement on 31 August 2012.

The midfielder signed for his former club, FC Bayern Alzenau, in September. Amiri had a successful spell at FC Bayern since rejoining the club, scoring five goals and assisting another eight goals in only 20 matches.

== International career ==
Amiri was first included in the Afghanistan national team when he was called up to his country's 2011 AFC Challenge Cup squad. He was an unused substitute in the defeat to Nepal on 7 April and the 1–0 win over Sri Lanka two days later, but made his debut for Afghanistan on 11 April after coming on as a 62nd-minute substitute in the 2–0 loss to Korea DPR in the final group game. Amiri had to wait two months for his second international cap, playing in the first half of the 2–0 loss to Palestine on 29 June 2011 in a 2014 FIFA World Cup qualifier.

== Personal life ==
Zubayr Amiri has two cousins who are also footballers, Germany international Nadiem Amiri and Nauwid Amiri.

== Career statistics ==
Scores and results list Afghanistan's goal tally first, score column indicates score after each Amiri goal.

List of international goals scored by Zubayr Amiri
No.	Date	Venue	Opponent	Score	Result	Competition
1	24 December 2015	Trivandrum International Stadium, Kariavattom, India	Bangladesh	3–0	4–0	2015 SAFF Championship
2	3 January 2016	Trivandrum International Stadium, Kariavattom, India	India	1–0	1–2 (a.e.t.)	2015 SAFF Championship
3	5 September 2017	King Abdullah II Stadium, Amman, Jordan	Jordan	1–3	1–4	2019 AFC Asian Cup qualification
4	11 June 2022	Salt Lake Stadium, Kolkata, India	India	1–1	1–2	2023 AFC Asian Cup qualification
