= Mustafa Hadid =

Afghan footballer

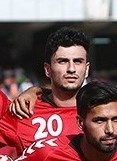
- Hadid with Afghanistan in 2015

Personal information
- Full name: Mustafa Hadid
- Date of birth: 25 August 1988 (age 38)
- Place of birth: Kabul, Afghanistan
- Height: 1.80 m (5 ft 11 in)
- Positions: Right-back; forward

Youth career
- 1998–2004: TuS Germania Schnelsen
- 2004–2006: Hamburger SV

Senior career*
Years	Team	Apps	(Gls)
2006–2007	TuS Germania Schnelsen	5	(2)
2007–2009	Eintracht Norderstedt	47	(20)
2009–2019	Altona 93	173	(29)
Total		225	(51)

International career
2009–2018	Afghanistan	39	(2)
Medal record
Men's football
Representing Afghanistan
SAFF Championship
Winner	2013 Nepal
- * Club domestic league appearances and goals

Mustafa Hadid (Persian: مصطفی حدید; born 25 August 1988) is an Afghan former footballer who played as a right-back or forward. Hadid also played for the Afghanistan national team.

== Club career ==
Born in Kabul, Hadid moved to Hamburg with his family in 2016, escaping the Third Afghan Civil War (1996–2001). He began his career in 1998 in the youth side of TuS Germania Schnelsen before joining the U-19 of Hamburger SV in summer 2004. He played in the Under 19 Bundesliga for Hamburger SV and returned to his first club TuS Germania Schnelsen in 2006. After one season in the Oberliga Hamburg for TuS Germania Schnelsen, he signed in summer 2007 for Eintracht Norderstedt. In August 2008, it was announced Hadid would play his former club Germania Schnelsen with Eintracht Norderstedt.

Hadid joined Altona 93 in 2009, where he was deployed as a right-back instead of a forward as he had been previously. In April 2016, while at Altona 93, he suffered an Anterior cruciate ligament injury in match against former club Eintracht Norderstedt.

== International career ==
Hadid played in Afghanistan national team's first friendly match at home in ten years against Pakistan. He won the 2013 SAFF Championship with Afghanistan. In January 2016, he competed with Afghanistan at the 2015 SAFF Championship. He played the full 120 minutes in the final against India which Afghanistan lost 2–1.

== Personal life ==
Hadid studied Environmental technology at the Hamburg University of Applied Sciences in Bergedorf.

== Career statistics ==
=== Club ===
Appearances and goals by club, season and competition
Club	Season	League		
Club	Season	Division	Apps	Goals
TuS Germania Schnelsen	2006–07	Oberliga Hamburg	5	2
Eintracht Norderstedt	2007–08	Verbandsliga Hamburg	20	9
Eintracht Norderstedt	2008–09	Oberliga Hamburg	27	11
Eintracht Norderstedt	Total		47	20
Altona 93	2009–10	Oberliga Hamburg	30	9
Altona 93	2010–11	Oberliga Hamburg	28	8
Altona 93	2011–12	Oberliga Hamburg	17	1
Altona 93	2012–13	Oberliga Hamburg	30	0
Altona 93	2013–14	Oberliga Hamburg	24	3
Altona 93	2014–15	Oberliga Hamburg	25	3
Altona 93	2015–16	Oberliga Hamburg	17	5
Altona 93	2016–17	Oberliga Hamburg	0	0
Altona 93	2017–18	Regionalliga Nord	2	0
Altona 93	Total		173	29
Career total			225	51

=== International ===
Scores and results list Afghanistan's goal tally first, score column indicates score after Hadid goal.

International goal scored by Mustafa Hadid
No.	Date	Venue	Opponent	Score	Result	Competition	Ref.
1	6 June 2008	Sugathadasa Stadium, Colombo, Sri Lanka	Bangladesh	2–0	2–2	2008 SAFF Championship	
2	9 April 2011	Halchowk Stadium, Kathmandu, Nepal	Sri Lanka	1–0	1–0	2012 AFC Challenge Cup qualification	

== Honours ==
Afghanistan

- SAFF Championship: 2013, runner-up 2015
