= Khaibar Amani =

Afghan footballer (born 1987)

Personal information
- Date of birth: 6 February 1987 (age 39)
- Place of birth: Frankfurt, Germany
- Height: 1.83 m (6 ft 0 in)
- Position: Forward

Team information
- Current team: FC Hanau 93

Youth career
- Kickers Offenbach
- Eintracht Frankfurt
- Mainz 05

Senior career*
Years	Team	Apps	(Gls)
2006–2010	Mainz 05 II	88	(25)
2010–2014	TGM SV Jügesheim	100	(50)
2014–2015	SV Rot-Weiß Hadamar	31	(16)
2015–2018	SC Hessen Dreieich	51	(21)
2018–	FC Hanau 93	0	(0)

International career^{‡}
2015–2019	Afghanistan	21	(7)
- * Club domestic league appearances and goals as of 3 August 2018 ‡ National team caps and goals as of 13 October 2017

Khaibar Amani (Dari: خیبر امانی; born 6 February 1987) is an Afghan footballer who plays for FC Hanau 93. Amani has also played for the Afghanistan national football team.

== Club career ==
Amani previously has played for Kickers Offenbach, 1. FSV Mainz 05 II, Rot-Weiß Hadamar and TGM SV Jügesheim. Amani joined FC Hanau 93 in May 2018.

== International career ==
Amani did get called up against Japan. He made his debut against Japan but they lost 6–0. After this match he played against Singapore and scored a goals against Cambodia. He also was called up for the matches in the 2015 SAFF Championship. He made an impressive beginning and scored 1 goal against Bangladesh and 2 goals against Bhutan. In the semi-final against Sri Lanka he scored from the penalty spot and is currently the topscorer of the tournament with 4 goals.

== Career statistics ==
Scores and results list Afghanistan's goal tally first.

Goal	Date	Venue	Opponent	Score	Result	Competition
1.	12 November 2015	Takhti Stadium, Tehran, Iran	Cambodia	3–0	3–0	2018 FIFA World Cup qualification
2.	24 December 2015	Trivandrum International Stadium, Kariavattom, India	Bangladesh	4–0	4–0	2015 SAFF Championship
3.	26 December 2015	Trivandrum International Stadium, Kariavattom, India	Bhutan	1–0	3–0	2015 SAFF Championship
4.	26 December 2015	Trivandrum International Stadium, Kariavattom, India	Bhutan	3–0	3–0	2015 SAFF Championship
5	31 December 2015	Trivandrum International Stadium, Kariavattom, India	Sri Lanka	3–0	5–0	2015 SAFF Championship
6	29 March 2016	Takhti Stadium, Tehran, Iran	Singapore	1–0	2–1	2018 FIFA World Cup qualification
7.	10 October 2017	Pamir Stadium, Dushanbe, Tajikistan	Jordan	3–2	3–3	2019 AFC Asian Cup qualification
