= Kanischka Taher =

Afghan footballer

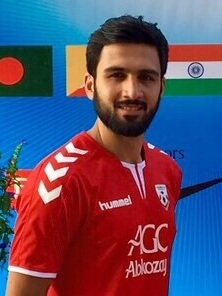

Personal information
- Date of birth: 4 April 1991 (age 35)
- Place of birth: Kabul, Afghanistan
- Height: 1.82 m (5 ft 11 1/2 in)
- Position: Midfielder

Team information
- Current team: Kapellen-Erft

Senior career*
Years	Team	Apps	(Gls)
2010–2012	Kaarst	50	(16)
2012–2013	Uedesheim	33	(2)
2013–2015	Alemannia Aachen II	30	(3)
2015–	Kapellen-Erft	27	(3)

International career^{‡}
2014–	Afghanistan U23	3	(0)
2015–	Afghanistan	13	(1)
- * Club domestic league appearances and goals as of 3 January 2016 ‡ National team caps and goals as of 3 January 2016

Kanischka Taher (Dari: كانشكا طاهر, born 4 April 1991) is an Afghan professional footballer who plays as a midfielder for Kapellen-Erft and the Afghanistan national football team.

== International ==
Taher played for the Afghanistan U23 side during the 2014 Asian Games. He made his competitive debut for the Afghanistan senior side on 8 September 2015 against Japan. He came on as an 88th-minute substitute as Afghanistan lost 6–0. He scored his first goal for his country on 31 December 2015 in the SAFF Championship against Sri Lanka. The 50th-minute goal helped Afghanistan win 5–0 and advance to the final against India.

== International goals ==
No.	Date	Venue	Opponent	Score	Result	Competition
1.	31 December 2015	Trivandrum International Stadium, Thiruvanathapuram, India	Sri Lanka	2–0	5–0	2015 SAFF Championship

== Career statistics ==
As of 3 January 2016

Afghanistan national team
Year	Apps	Goals
2015	5	1
Total	5	1
