= Masih Saighani =

Afghan footballer

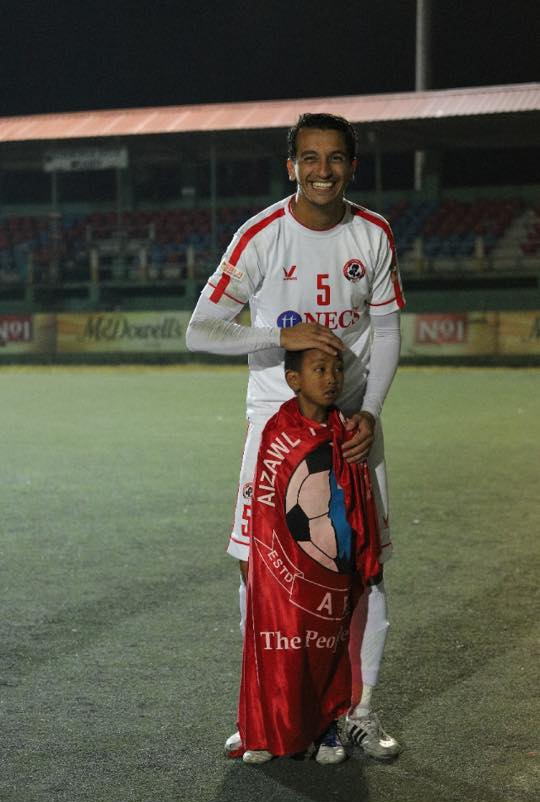
- Masih with Aizawl in 2017

Personal information
- Date of birth: 22 September 1986 (age 40)
- Place of birth: Kabul, Afghanistan
- Height: 1.90 m (6 ft 3 in)
- Positions: Defensive midfielder; central defender

Team information
- Current team: Türk Gücü Friedberg
- Number: 5

Youth career
- 2004: VfB Marburg

Senior career*
Years	Team	Apps	(Gls)
2004–2005	VfB Marburg	2	(1)
2005–2006	SC Waldgirmes	30	(1)
2006–2007	Bonner SC	5	(0)
2007–2009	SC Waldgirmes		
2009–2010	VfB Marburg	33	(6)
2010–2011	Eintracht Wetzlar	34	(5)
2011–2012	Sportfreunde Siegen	9	(0)
2012–2013	SC Waldgirmes	26	(6)
2013–2015	TSV Steinbach	65	(23)
2016	TSV Eintracht Stadtallendorf	8	(1)
2016	FC Ederbergland	12	(0)
2017	Türk Gücü Friedberg	16	(4)
2017–2018	Aizawl	14	(1)
2018–2019	Dhaka Abahani	17	(2)
2019–2020	Chennaiyin	12	(1)
2020–2021	Dhaka Abahani	22	(4)
2021	Real Kashmir	4	(0)
2021–	Türk Gücü Friedberg	26	(3)

International career
2015–	Afghanistan	13	(2)
- * Club domestic league appearances and goals as of 19 November 2022

Masih Saighani (Dari: مسیح سیغانی; born 22 September 1986) is an Afghan professional footballer who plays as a defender for German club Türk Gücü Friedberg in Hessenliga, and the Afghanistan national team.

== Club career ==
=== Aizawl ===
On 26 August 2017, Saighani signed for the I-League Champions, Aizawl F.C. This was his first football experience outside Germany where he had been playing since 2004. Masih made his debut for Aizawl in the Mizoram Premier League versus Mizoram Police FC. His I-League debut came vs. East Bengal F.C. in a 2–2 draw. In the following game vs. Churchill Brothers S.C., he was adjudged the Man of the Match for his solid display in defense & playmaking attributes after Aizawl F.C. beat Churchill Brothers S.C. 1–0.

Masih made his continental debut for Aizawl F.C. vs. Zob Ahan Esfahan F.C. in the AFC Champions League Qualifiers. The I-League Champions were beaten down 3–1 but Masih & his club's performance received appreciation from the critics. He opened his account in the top tier of Indian Football vs. Indian Arrows in a 2–2 draw.

Saighani finished his debut season in Indian Football with Runners' Up spot in the Mizoram Premier League, Fifth place finish in the I-League & a Quarter Final participation in the Super Cup. He rose to spotlight in the inaugural season.

=== Real Kashmir ===
In September 2021, Saighani signed with another I-League club Real Kashmir.

== Personal life ==
Masih Saighani is a Muslim and belongs to Tajik ethnic group. He was born on 22 September 1986 in Kabul. His family is originally from Saighan, Bamyan.

== International goals ==
Goal	Date	Venue	Opponent	Score	Result	Competition
1	24 December 2015	Trivandrum International Stadium, Kariavattom, India	Bangladesh	1–0	4–0	2015 SAFF Championship
2	26 December 2015	Trivandrum International Stadium, Kariavattom, India	Bhutan	2–0	3–0	2015 SAFF Championship

== Club statistics ==
Competition	Matches	Goals
Season 2017/18		
I-League	14	1
Mizoram Premier League	9	4
AFC Champions League (Q)	1	0
2018 AFC Cup	6	0
Super Cup	2	0
