= Pangappara =

Pangappara is a place in the Trivandrum district of Kerala, India. The place lies between Kariavattom and Sreekaryam. C.H. Mohammad Koya Memorial State Institute for the Mentally Challenged, popularly known as SIMC and a Medical College Health Centre are located in Pangappara.
