= Hamidullah Wakily =

Afghan footballer, goalkeeper

Hamidullah Wakili
Personal information
- Full name: Hamidullah Haji Abdullah Wakili
- Date of birth: 30 June 1994 (age 32)
- Place of birth: Farah, Afghanistan
- Height: 1.85 m (6 ft 1 in)
- Position: Goalkeeper

Team information
- Current team: De Maiwand Atalan

Senior career*
Years	Team	Apps	(Gls)
2014–2018	Toofan Harirod		
2018–	De Maiwand Atalan		

International career^{‡}
2017–2018	Afghanistan	3	(0)
- * Club domestic league appearances and goals as of 19 January 2019 ‡ National team caps and goals as of 19 January 2019

Hamidullah Haji Abdullah Wakily (Dari: حمیدالله وکیلی; born 30 June 1994) is an Afghan footballer who plays for De Maiwand Atalan and the Afghanistan national football team.

== International career ==
Wakily made his senior international debut on 10 October 2017 in a 3–3 draw with Jordan in AFC Asian Cup qualification.
