= Omid Popalzay =

Afghan footballer

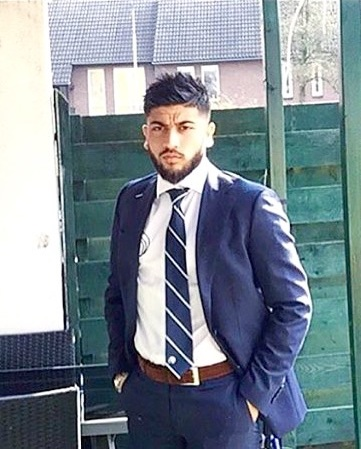

Personal information
- Full name: Omid Popalzay
- Date of birth: 25 January 1996 (age 30)
- Place of birth: Kabul, Afghanistan
- Height: 1.70 m (5 ft 7 in)
- Position: Attacking midfielder

Team information
- Current team: Persiraja Banda Aceh
- Number: 19

Youth career
- SV Estria
- –2015: NEC

Senior career*
Years	Team	Apps	(Gls)
2015–2018	Achilles '29	53	(5)
2018	Lienden	11	(0)
2019	Adelaide Comets	4	(1)
2019–2020	Sint-Eloois-Winkel	4	(0)
2020–2021	Olimpia Grudziądz	30	(3)
2021–2022	Chittagong Abahani	20	(5)
2023	Ariana	3	(0)
2023	Nejmeh	2	(0)
2023–2024	PSPS Pekanbaru	22	(7)
2024–2025	PSIM Yogyakarta	10	(1)
2025	Prime Bangkok	0	(0)
2026–	Persiraja Banda Aceh	11	(2)

International career^{‡}
2015–	Afghanistan	44	(7)
- * Club domestic league appearances and goals as of 2 May 2026 ‡ National team caps and goals as of 10 June 2025

Omid Popalzay (Pashto: امید پوپلزی; born 25 January 1996) is an Afghan professional footballer who plays as an attacking midfielder for Championship club Persiraja Banda Aceh and the Afghanistan national team.

== Youth ==
Before joining Achilles '29 in 2015 Omid Popalzay played in the youth of SV Estria and N.E.C./FC Oss.

== Career ==
=== Achilles '29 ===
He signed in July 2015 his first professional contract for Achilles '29. He was signed to play for the second team of Achilles '29 but was given a change for the first team after he impressed. On 11 September 2015 he made his debut for Achilles '29 against Sparta Rotterdam. He scored his first goal in a 2–1 win against FC Den Bosch. One week after the win against FC Den Bosch he scored another goal and made an assist against Jong PSV with the result being a 3–2 win for Achilles '29.

=== Australia and Belgium ===
In the beginning of 2019, Popalzay moved abroad to Australia and joined Adelaide Comets. In May 2019, he left the club to join Belgian club Sint-Eloois-Winkel.

=== Olimpia Grudziądz ===
On 11 August 2020, Popalzay signed a contract with Polish club Olimpia Grudziądz.

=== Chittagong Abahani ===
On 22 November 2021, Popalzay joined Bangladesh Premier League club Chittagong Abahani.

=== Ariana ===
After a failed move to Kelantan, Popalzay signed a deal with Swedish Ettan Fotboll club Ariana at the end of March 2023.

=== Nejmeh ===
On 11 June 2023, Popalzay joined Lebanese Premier League club Nejmeh and won the title in the 2023–24 Lebanese Premier League

=== PSPS Pekanbaru ===
Popalzay joined PSPS Pekanbaru for the 2024–2025 season.

=== PSIM Yogyakarta ===
Popalzay then joined PSIM Yogyakarta on 11 December 2024. Eight days later, he made his league debut for PSIM Yogyakarta in a 1–2 home lose against Bhayangkara. He had a good season in this season with 10 appearances and one goal, and won the 2024–25 Liga 2 title.

== International career ==
Omid Popalzay made his debut for the Afghanistan national team in their World Cup Qualification match against Singapore on 8 October 2015. They lost the match 1–0. After this match, he also played for the national team against Syria and Cambodia.

== Personal life ==
Popalzay holds both Dutch and Afghan passports.

== Career statistics ==
=== Club ===
Statistics accurate as of last match played on 9 November 2016.

Club performance			League		Cup		Continental		Other		Total	
Season	Club	League	Apps	Goals	Apps	Goals	Apps	Goals	Apps	Goals	Apps	Goals
Netherlands			League		KNVB Cup		Europe^{1}		Other^{2}		Total	
2015–16	Achilles '29	Eerste Divisie	19	4	—		—		—		19	4
2016–17	Achilles '29	Eerste Divisie	12	1	1	0	—		—		13	1
Total	Netherlands		31	5	1	0	—		—		32	5
Career total			31	5	1	0	—		—		32	5

^{1} Includes UEFA Champions League and UEFA Europa League matches.

^{2} Includes Johan Cruijff Shield matches.

=== International ===
Scores and results list Afghanistan's goal tally first.

No	Date	Venue	Opponent	Score	Result	Competition
1.	28 December 2015	Trivandrum International Stadium, Thiruvananthapuram, India	Maldives	2–1	4–1	2015 SAFF Championship
2.	28 December 2015	Trivandrum International Stadium, Thiruvananthapuram, India	Maldives	4–1	4–1	2015 SAFF Championship
3.	6 June 2017	Al-Rashid Stadium, Dubai, United Arab Emirates	Maldives	2–1	2–1	Friendly
4.	11 June 2021	Jassim bin Hamad Stadium, Doha, Qatar	Oman	1–1	1–2	2022 FIFA World Cup qualification
5.	16 November 2021	Gloria Sports Complex, Antalya, Turkey	Indonesia	1–0	1–0	Friendly
6.	12 September 2023	Rizal Memorial Stadium, Manila, Philippines	Philippines	1–0	1–2	Friendly
7.	25 March 2025	Thuwunna Stadium, Yangon, Myanmar	Myanmar	1–0	1–2	2027 AFC Asian Cup qualification
8.	26 March 2026	Thuwunna Stadium, Yangon, Myanmar	Myanmar	1–0	1–2	2027 AFC Asian Cup qualification

== Honours ==
Nejmeh

- Lebanese Premier League: 2023–24

PSIM Yogyakarta

- Liga 2: 2024–25
