= Faysal Shayesteh =

Afghan footballer (born 1991)

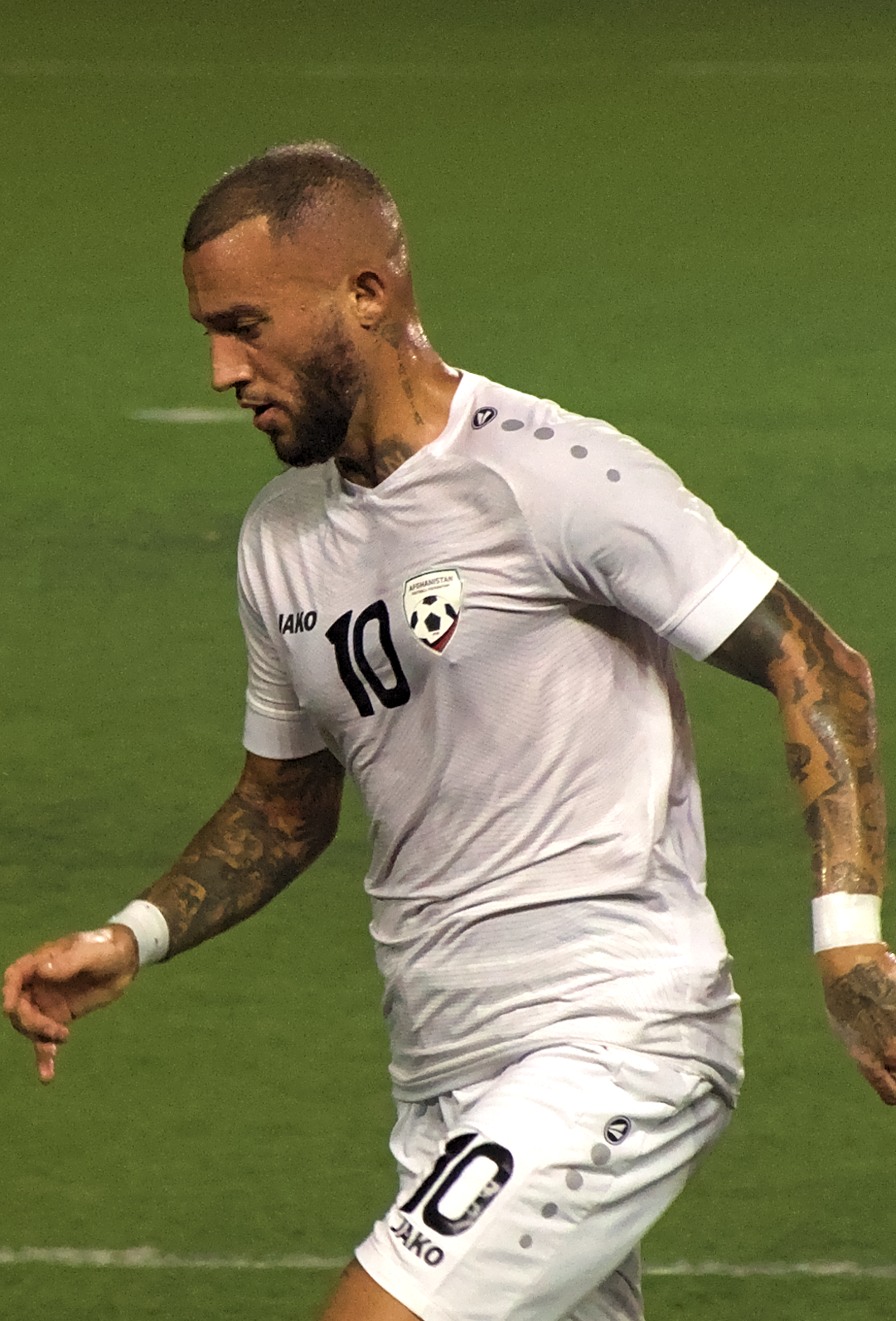
- Shayesteh with Afghanistan in 2023

Personal information
- Full name: Faysal Shayesteh
- Date of birth: 10 June 1991 (age 35)
- Place of birth: Kabul, Afghanistan
- Height: 1.79 m (5 ft 10 in)
- Positions: Winger; attacking midfielder

Team information
- Current team: Sreenidi Deccan
- Number: 10

Youth career
- 2009–2010: Twente
- 2010–2012: SC Heerenveen

Senior career*
Years	Team	Apps	(Gls)
2013	Etar Veliko Tarnovo	10	(1)
2014–2015	Songkhla United	24	(7)
2016–2017	Pahang FA	10	(1)
2017	Paykan	1	(0)
2017–2018	Gokulam Kerala	1	(0)
2018	Lampang	11	(1)
2019	Air Force Central	11	(0)
2019	Lampang	16	(2)
2020–2022	VV DUNO	29	(3)
2022–	Sreenidi Deccan	62	(6)

International career^{‡}
2014–	Afghanistan	59	(10)
- * Club domestic league appearances and goals as of 16:02, 5 April 2025 (UTC) ‡ National team caps and goals as of 10:24, 17 October 2023 (UTC)

Faysal Shayesteh (Dari: فیصل شایسته; born 10 June 1991) is an Afghan professional footballer who plays as an attacking midfielder for I-League club Sreenidi Deccan and is the all-time top goalscorer for the Afghanistan national team.

== Youth career ==
Born in Kabul, Shayesteh moved to the Netherlands and played in the youth academy of FC Twente, until he signed with Heerenveen in 2010.

== Club career ==
=== Heerenveen ===
Shayesteh, 18-years old then, joined Heerenveen in the summer of 2010. He signed a contract until the summer of 2012.

=== Etar ===
In February 2013, Shayesteh joined Bulgarian A PFG club Etar 1924. On 2 March, he made his league debut in a 2–1 home win over Montana, coming on as a substitute in the 88th minute.

=== Songkhla United ===
In October 2013, Shayesteh made a transfer move to Thailand football club Songkhla United after his contract expired with Etar. He was given shirt number 10. He left Songkhla after they relegated in 2015.

=== Pahang ===
In July 2016, Shayesteh announced on Facebook that he joined Pahang. It was also announced that he will play with shirt number 10. After just 6 months he resigned with Pahang.

=== Paykan ===
In January 2017, Shayesteh signed a one-and-a-half-year contract with Paykan F.C. to becoming the first ever Afghan professional footballer in the Persian Gulf Pro League.

=== Gokulam Kerala ===
On 19 November 2017, Shayesteh moved to I-League and signed with Gokulam Kerala for a season, but appeared in a single match for the side.

=== Lampang ===
In June 2018, he moved to Thailand and signed with Thai League 2 side Lampang.

=== VV DUNO ===
In 2020, Shayesteh moved back to the Netherlands and joined VV DUNO in the Hoofdklasse.

=== Sreenidi Deccan ===
In August 2022, I-League side Sreenidi Deccan announced the signing of Shayesteh for the 2022–23 season. He was part of team that earned qualification for 2023 Indian Super Cup. In the group stage opener, he scored a goal in their 1–1 draw with Bengaluru. They maintained their good form in second match when Sreenidi defeated Kerala Blasters by 2–0 on 12 April, but failed to progress to the semi-finals after 1–0 defeat to RoundGlass Punjab in last match.

== International career ==
On 13 April 2014, Shayesteh made his debut for the Afghan national team in a friendly match against Kyrgyzstan. He played as left fullback. In the 17th minute of the match he missed a penalty. On 14 May 2014, Afghanistan played a friendly match against Kuwait, where Shayesteh scored off a free-kick.

On 22 May 2014, Shayesteh scored his first goal with a free-kick from nearly 50 meters against Turkmenistan in the 2014 AFC Challenge Cup. After Djelaludin Sharityar retired, Shayesteh became the new captain of the national team. He led the team to the final of the 2015 SAFF Championship in Tiruvanantapuram, which was the country's last participation. He scored three goals in that competition but finished as runners-up, as Afghanistan lost 1–2 to India. In April 2016, he was named as Afghanistan's Athlete of the Year for 2015.

== Personal life ==
He is the younger brother of Qays Shayesteh, who also plays football and represented Afghanistan national team from 2011 to 2017.

== Career statistics ==
=== Club ===
As of 16 April 2023

Appearances and goals by club, season and competition
Club	Season	League			National cup (Note: Includes Thai FA Cup, KNVB Cup, Super Cup)		Continental		Total	
Club	Season	Division	Apps	Goals	Apps	Goals	Apps	Goals	Apps	Goals
Etar Veliko; Tarnovo	2012–13	Bulgarian First League	10	1	0	0	—		10	1
Songkhla United	2014	Thai Premier League	17	3	0	0	—		17	3
Songkhla United	2015	Thai Division 1 League	7	4	0	0	—		7	4
Songkhla United	Total		24	7	0	0	0	0	24	7
Pahang	2016	Malaysia Super League	10	1	0	0	—		10	1
Paykan	2016–17	Persian Gulf Pro League	1	0	0	0	—		1	0
Lampang	2018	Thai League 2	11	1	2	1	—		13	2
Air Force Central	2019	Thai League 2	11	0	1	0	—		12	0
Lampang	2019	Thai League 2	16	2	0	0	—		16	2
VV DUNO	2020–21	Hoofdklasse	5	0	1	0	—		6	0
VV DUNO	2021–22	Hoofdklasse	24	3	0	0	—		24	3
VV DUNO	Total		29	3	1	0	0	0	30	3
Sreenidi Deccan	2022–23	I-League	22	4	4 (Note: Appearance(s) in Super Cup)	2	—		26	6
Career total			134	19	8	3	0	0	142	22

=== International ===
Scores and results list Afghanistan's goal tally first, score column indicates score after each Shayesteh goal.

List of international goals scored by Faysal Shayesteh
No.	Date	Venue	Opponent	Score	Result	Competition
1	14 May 2014	Al Kuwait Sports Club Stadium, Kaifan, Kuwait	Kuwait	2–3	2–3	Friendly
2	22 May 2014	Addu Football Stadium, Addu City, Maldives	Turkmenistan	3–1	3–1	2014 AFC Challenge Cup
3	29 May 2015	New Laos National Stadium, Vientiane, Laos	Laos	1–0	2–0	Friendly
4	13 October 2015	Al-Seeb Stadium, Seeb, Oman	Syria	2–3	2–5	2018 FIFA World Cup qualification
5	24 December 2015	Trivandrum International Stadium, Thiruvananthapuram, India	Bangladesh	2–0	4–0	2015 SAFF Championship
6	28 December 2015	Trivandrum International Stadium, Thiruvananthapuram, India	Maldives	1–0	4–1	2015 SAFF Championship
7	31 December 2015	Trivandrum International Stadium, Thiruvananthapuram, India	Sri Lanka	5–0	5–0	2015 SAFF Championship
8	28 December 2018	Miracle Hotel Resort, Antalya, Turkey	Turkmenistan	1–0	2–0	Friendly
9	23 March 2019	Bukit Jalil National Stadium, Kuala Lumpur, Malaysia	Malaysia	1–0	1–2	2019 Airmarine Cup
10	14 June 2022	Salt Lake Stadium, Kolkata, India	Cambodia	1–0	2–2	2023 AFC Asian Cup qualification

== Honours ==
Afghanistan

- SAFF Championship: runner-up 2015

Individual

- Afghanistan's Athlete of the Year: 2015
