= Sayed Mohammad Hashemi =

Afghan footballer

Mohammad Hashemi
Personal information
- Full name: Sayed Mohammad Hashemi
- Date of birth: 2 March 1994 (age 32)
- Place of birth: Herat, Afghanistan
- Height: 1.92 m (6 ft 4 in)
- Position: Defender

Senior career*
Years	Team	Apps	(Gls)
2012–2017	Shaheen Asmayee F.C.		

International career
2015–2017	Afghanistan	10	(1)
- * Club domestic league appearances and goals

Sayed Mohammad Hashemi (Dari: سید محمد هاشمی, born 2 March 1994) is an Afghan international footballer who plays as a defender for Shaheen Asmayee F.C. He has also played for the Afghan national team.

== International goals ==
No.	Date	Venue	Opponent	Score	Result	Competition
1.	31 December 2015	Trivandrum International Stadium, Thiruvananthapuram, India	Sri Lanka	1–0	5–0	2015 SAFF Championship

== Honours ==
Afghan Premier League: 2013, 2014
