= Ahmad Hatifi =

Afghan footballer

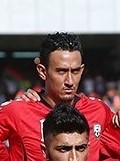
- Hatifi with Afghanistan in 2015

Personal information
- Full name: Ahmad Arash Hatifi
- Date of birth: 13 March 1986 (age 40)
- Place of birth: Oakland, California, United States
- Height: 1.87 m (6 ft 1 1/2 in)
- Position: Midfielder

Team information
- Current team: Afghan Premier FC
- Number: 10

Youth career
- East Bay United/Bay Oaks

College career
Years	Team	Apps	(Gls)
2005–2008	UC Davis Aggies		

Senior career*
Years	Team	Apps	(Gls)
2012–2013	Bay Area Ambassadors		
2013–2014	Mumbai	15	(1)
2015	Sacramento Republic		
2015	IFX Ballistic United		
2016–2018	CD Aguiluchos USA		
2019–?	Oakland Stompers		
2024–	Afghan Premier FC	10	(2)

International career^{‡}
2011–2017	Afghanistan	34	(4)
Medal record
Men's football
Representing Afghanistan
SAFF Championship
Winner	2013 Nepal
- * Club domestic league appearances and goals as of 29 March 2025 ‡ National team caps and goals as of 1 February 2016

Ahmad Arash Hatifi (born 13 March 1986) is a professional footballer who currently plays as a midfielder for Afghan Premier FC in The League for Clubs. Born in the United States, he played for the Afghanistan national team.

== Club career ==
=== Youth ===
Born in Oakland, California, Hatifi grew up in Alameda, California, and attended Alameda High School, where he captained the varsity soccer team. He then started to attend University of California, Davis in 2004 where played for the soccer team in 2005. He captained the team in his junior and senior years. After leaving college, Hatifi played for the Bay Area Ambassadors of the National Premier Soccer League, the fourth tier of American soccer, from 2012 to 2013.

=== Mumbai ===
On 1 November 2013 it was confirmed that Hatifi had signed with Mumbai FC of the I-League in India. He made his debut for the side the next day against Bengaluru FC at the Balewadi Sports Complex, in which he started and played 87 minutes as Mumbai drew the match 2–2.

== International career ==
In 2007, Hatifi was selected to play for Afghanistan in the World Cup qualifiers against Syria and Sri Lanka. He scored his first goal for his country on 20 August 2013 against Pakistan in which he found the net in the 32nd minute as Afghanistan went on to win the match 3–0. He then won his first ever championship with Afghanistan on 11 September 2013 when his country won the 2013 SAFF Championship by beating India 2–0. On 22 May Hatifi scored the second goal in Afghanistan's 3–1 victory over Turkmenistan at the 2014 AFC Challenge Cup. This was also Afghanistan's first every victory at the AFC Challenge Cup in eight attempts.

After Afghanistan's 0–0 draw with Laos that confirmed their progression out of the group stage, an accident occurred while the Afghan players were being driven back to their hotel. Hatifi suffered injuries along with teammates Zohib Islam Amiri, Faisal Sakhizada, Balal Arezou, and Mustafa Azadzoy, the latter of which had to take three weeks off to recover, while Hatifi was set to miss two weeks. All five players were set to miss the semi-finals against Palestine. Former coach Mohammad Yousef Kargar and current coach Erich Rutemöller also suffered minor injuries.

== Career statistics ==
=== Club ===
As of 27 April 2014

Club	Season	League			Federation Cup		Durand Cup		AFC		Total	
Club	Season	Division	Apps	Goals	Apps	Goals	Apps	Goals	Apps	Goals	Apps	Goals
Mumbai	2013–14	I-League	15	1	0	0	—	—	—	—	15	1
Career total			15	1	0	0	0	0	0	0	15	1

=== National team statistics ===
As of 2 November 2013

Afghanistan national team
Year	Apps	Goals
2011	3	0
2013	8	1
Total	11	1

=== International goals ===
Goal	Date	Venue	Opponent	Score	Result	Competition
1	20 August 2013	Ghazi Stadium, Kabul, Afghanistan	Pakistan	2–0	3–0	International friendly
2	22 May 2014	Addu Football Stadium, Addu City, Maldives	Turkmenistan	2–0	3–1	2014 AFC Challenge Cup
3	28 December 2015	Trivandrum International Stadium, Thiruvananthapuram, India	Maldives	3–1	4–1	2015 SAFF Championship
4	31 December 2015	Trivandrum International Stadium, Thiruvananthapuram, India	Sri Lanka	4–0	5–0	2015 SAFF Championship

== Honours ==
Afghanistan

- SAFF Championship: 2013
