= Esmat Shanwary =

Afghan footballer

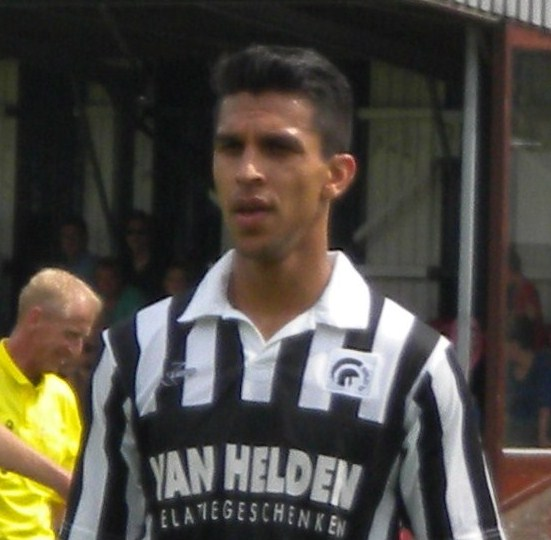
- Shanwary with his former club Achilles '29.

Personal information
- Full name: Esmat Shanwary
- Date of birth: 9 October 1993 (age 33)
- Place of birth: Kabul, Afghanistan
- Positions: Midfielder; winger

Team information
- Current team: FC Lienden
- Number: 11

Youth career
- VV Sluiskil
- GVV '57
- 2003–2009: NEC
- 2009–2012: NEC/Oss
- 2012–2014: Utrecht

Senior career*
Years	Team	Apps	(Gls)
2014–2015	Achilles '29	13	(0)
2015	GVVV	11	(0)
2016–2017	HSV Hoek		
2017	UDI '19	3	(0)
2017–2018	DESO		
2018–2019	SV Hatert		
2019–2020	FC Lienden		
2020–2023	Achilles '29		
2023–	Olympia '25		

International career
2006–2008	Netherlands u-15	7	(0)
2008–2009	Netherlands u-16	4	(0)
2015	Afghanistan	5	(1)
- * Club domestic league appearances and goals

Esmat Shanwary (Dari: عصمت شنواری; born 9 October 1993) is an Afghan footballer who plays as a midfielder for Derde Klasse club Olympia '25.

== Youth ==
Shanwary played in the youth of VV Sluiskil, GVV '57, N.E.C., N.E.C./FC Oss and FC Utrecht before joining Achilles '29 in 2014.

== Career ==
Shanwary signed his first professional contract for FC Utrecht. Many clubs where interested in signing him but he said no to clubs like De Graafschap, PSV and his former club N.E.C. Shanwary was on trial at De Graafschap and PSV and made a good impression but FC Utrecht came with the best offer. In his first match for FC Utrecht he got injured which ended his season. In the 2014–2015 season Shanwary played for First Division club Achilles '29. Esmat made his debut in an away match against Jong PSV as a substitute. Shanwary made his debut in the KNVB Beker as a substitute against FC Twente. Esmat signed a contract with Topklasse club GVVV in May 2015. On 15 December 2015, the club decided not to renew his contract. He had to leave the club. Shanwary signed a contract with HSV Hoek in November.

== International career ==
Shanwary was called up for the Afghanistan national team for a friendly match against Kyrgyzstan on 31 March 2015. Because of a heavy snow storm the match was cancelled. Eventually he made his debut against Laos in a friendly match. They won the match with 2–0. Shanwary played his second game for the Afghanistan national team against Bangladesh. He came in the second half as a substitute. He scored in the last minutes of the game with a beautiful shot which made the score end in a 1–1 draw.

== International goals ==
Goal	Date	Venue	Opponent	Score	Result	Competition
1	2 June 2015	Bangabandhu National Stadium, Dhaka, Bangladesh	Bangladesh	1–1	1–1	Friendly

== Personal life ==
Shanwary holds both Dutch and Afghan passports.
