= Norlla Amiri =

Afghan footballer (born 1991)

Noraollah Amiri
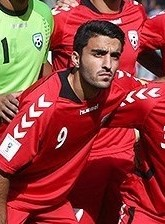

Personal information
- Full name: Noraollah Amiri
- Date of birth: 23 August 1991 (age 35)
- Place of birth: Malmö, Sweden
- Height: 1.72 m (5 ft 8 in)
- Position: Right midfielder

Team information
- Current team: Ariana
- Number: 11

Youth career
- Olympic
- LB07
- Rörsjöstaden

Senior career*
Years	Team	Apps	(Gls)
2009–2010	Lilla Torg	41	(11)
2011–2014	Lunds BK	66	(16)
2013	→ Prespa Birlik (loan)	16	(0)
2015–2017	Trelleborgs FF	31	(4)
2017	FC Rosengård	5	(0)
2018	Lunds BK	8	(2)
2018–	Ariana	71	(16)

International career^{‡}
2015–	Afghanistan	31	(4)
- * Club domestic league appearances and goals as of 1 August 2024 ‡ National team caps and goals as of 24 November 2018

Noraollah Amiri (Dari: نورالله امیری, born 23 August 1991) is an Afghan footballer who plays as a midfielder who plays for Ariana FC and the Afghanistan national team.

== Club career ==
=== Trelleborgs FF ===
In April 2015, Amiri signed with Trelleborgs FF. He made his league debut for the club on 13 April 2015 in a 3–2 home victory over Eskilsminne. He was subbed on for Furkan Motori in the 66th minute. He scored his first league goal for the club as part of a brace on 16 August 2015 in a 7–0 home victory over Norrby. He scored in the 8th and 25th minutes. In July 2017, it was revealed that Amiri's contract would not be extended and he would be released following the end of the season.

=== Rosengard ===
On 1 August 2017, Amiri was loaned out to FC Rosengård. He made his league debut for the club on 19 August 2017 in a 2–1 away defeat to Skövde AIK. He was subbed on for Ismael Hussein at halftime.

=== Return to Lunds BK ===
On 22 December 2017, Amiri rejoined former club Lunds BK in Division 1.

=== Ariana FC ===
Amiri joined Ariana FC in July 2018.

== International career ==
Amiri made his league debut for Afghanistan on 16 June 2015 in a 1–0 away victory over Cambodia in World Cup Qualifying. In August 2015, Amiri was called up once again for a World Cup Qualifier against Japan and a friendly against Thailand.

=== International goals ===
Goal	Date	Venue	Opponent	Score	Result	Competition
1	13 October 2015	Al-Seeb Stadium, Seeb, Oman	Syria	1–3	2–5	2018 FIFA World Cup qualification
2	12 November 2015	Takhti Stadium, Tehran, Iran	Cambodia	2–0	3–0	2018 FIFA World Cup qualification
3	11 October 2016	Shah Alam Stadium, Shah Alam, Malaysia	Malaysia	1–0	1–1	Friendly match
4	25 May 2021	Jebel Ali Centre of Excellence, Dubai, United Arab Emirates	Indonesia	1–0	3–2	Friendly match
