= Mustafa Zazai =

Afghan footballer

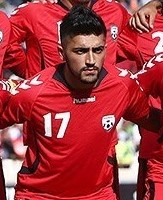
- Zazai lining up with Afghanistan in 2015

Personal information
- Full name: Mustafa Zazai
- Date of birth: 9 May 1993 (age 33)
- Place of birth: Kabul, Afghanistan
- Height: 1.77 m (5 ft 10 in)
- Position: Midfielder

Youth career
- 2006–2009: Hamburger SV
- 2009–2011: SC Concordia Hamburg
- 2011–2012: VfB Lübeck

Senior career*
Years	Team	Apps	(Gls)
2012–2013	VfB Lübeck	23	(3)
2013–2015	FC St. Pauli II	52	(3)
2016–2017	TSG Neustrelitz	17	(1)
2017–2018	LSK Hansa	10	(0)
2018	Chachoengsao F.C.	11	(7)
2018	Phrae United	10	(5)
2019	Kelantan	9	(1)
2019	Phnom Penh Crown	12	(7)
2020–2021	Visakha	27	(2)
2022	Boeung Ket	26	(3)

International career^{‡}
2014–	Afghanistan	24	(2)
- * Club domestic league appearances and goals as of 17 February 2019 ‡ National team caps and goals as of 28 January 2019

Mustafa Zazai (born 9 May 1993) is an Afghan footballer who plays as a midfielder for the Cambodian club Riel Phnom Penh and formerly the Afghanistan national team.

== Early life ==
Zazai was born in Kabul in 1993, to a Pashtun family. He moved to Germany in the following years.

== Youth ==
Zazai played in the youth of many German clubs. He played in the youth of HSV Hamburg, Concordia Hamburg and VfB Lübeck.

== Club career ==
After being promoted to the first team of VfB Lübeck he played 23 matches and scored 3 goals. At the end of the season he was contacted by FC St. Pauli II if he wants to play for them. He accepted the offer. He played mostly as an attacking midfielder. He scored 5 goal in 24 matches.

On 23 January 2019, Zazai signed a contract with Malaysia Premier League side, Kelantan.

== International career ==
He was selected by the head coach for the 2014 AFC Challenge Cup in the Maldives. He was 21 years old when he gave his debut for the national team.

=== International goals ===
Scores and results list Afghanistan's goal tally first.

List	Date	Venue	Opponent	Score	Result	Competition
1.	16 June 2015	Phnom Penh Olympic Stadium, Phnom Penh, Cambodia	Cambodia	1–0	1–0	2018 FIFA World Cup qualification
2.	12 November 2015	Takhti Stadium, Tehran, Iran	Cambodia	1–0	3–0	2018 FIFA World Cup qualification
3.	14 June 2022	Salt Lake Stadium, Kolkata, India	Cambodia	2–0	2–2	2023 AFC Asian Cup qualification
