= 2015 SAFF Championship =

Football tournament between SAFF member states

2015 SAFF Suzuki Cup
- 2015 SAFF Championship official logo

Tournament details
- Host country: India
- Dates: 23 December 2015 – 3 January 2016
- Teams: 7 (from 1 confederation)
- Venue: 1 (in 1 host city)

Final positions
- Champions: India (7th title)
- Runners-up: Afghanistan

Tournament statistics
- Matches played: 12
- Goals scored: 44 (3.67 per match)
- Top scorer: (Afghanistan) Khaibar Amani (4 goals)
- Best player: (India) Sunil Chhetri

The 2015 SAFF Championship (officially known as the SAFF Suzuki Cup 2015 for sponsorship reasons) was the 11th edition of the SAFF Championship, the biennial international men's football championship of South Asia organized by SAFF. It was held in India from 23 December 2015 to 3 January 2016.

Heading into the tournament, Afghanistan were the defending champions of the tournament, with it also being the last time they can officially take part, as they have become members of the newly formed Central Asian Football Association.

The tournament saw no participation from Pakistan, who withdrew from the tournament in November 2015 due a dispute within the nation's football federation.

India was chosen as the host nation on 10 September 2013 with the host venue to be decided between Delhi and Kerala. In July 2015, it was announced that matches during the tournament would be held at the Trivandrum International Stadium in Thiruvananthapuram, Kerala. This is the third time in which India has hosted the tournament, when it was known as the Gold Cup in 1999 and under the current name in 2011.

== Participating nations ==
Apart from hosts India, six other South Asian nations participated in the tournament, with Pakistan being the only nation not participating. There was no reason cited by the PFF but issues with the federation's elections have forced the courts to prohibit any activities.

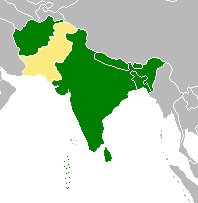
Participating nations The participating nations (Pakistan did not participate).

Country	Appearance	Previous best performance	FIFA ranking December 2015
India (Host)	11th	Champions (Six times) (Note: India has won in 1993, 1997, 1999, 2005, 2009 and 2011.)	166
Afghanistan	8th	Champions (2013)	150
Bangladesh	10th	Champions (2003)	182
Bhutan	7th	Semi-finals (2008)	188
Maldives	9th	Champions (2008)	160
Nepal	11th	Third-place (1993)	192
Sri Lanka	11th	Champions (1995)	194

== Venue ==
On 2 July 2015, it was announced that the matches during the tournament would take place at the newly constructed Greenfield Stadium in Thiruvananthapuram, Kerala.

Thiruvananthapuram	2015 SAFF Championship is located in India
Trivandrum International Stadium	2015 SAFF Championship is located in India
Capacity: 50,000	2015 SAFF Championship is located in India

== Broadcasting ==
The tournament was broadcast live in India on STAR Sports 4, Kantipur Television Network in Nepal, Lemar TV and Tolo TV in Afghanistan. Gazi TV in Bangladesh, Bhutan Broadcasting Service in Bhutan and Television Maldives in Maldives. Every match was broadcast live on YouTube.

== Group stage ==
All times are local, IST (UTC+5:30).

=== Group A ===
Pos	Team	Pld	W	D	L	GF	GA	GD	Pts	Status
1	India (H)	2	2	0	0	6	1	+5	6	Qualified for semi-finals
2	Sri Lanka	2	1	0	1	1	2	−1	3	Qualified for semi-finals
3	Nepal	2	0	0	2	1	5	−4	0	

Source: soccerway.com
(H) Hosts
23 December 2015
18:30

Nepal	0–1	Sri Lanka
	Report	Rifnas 90+5'

Trivandrum International Stadium, Thiruvananthapuram
Attendance: 200
Referee: Jameel Juma Abdulhusain (Bahrain)

25 December 2015
18:30

Sri Lanka	0–2	India
	Report	Singh 51', 73'

Trivandrum International Stadium, Thiruvananthapuram
Attendance: 6,417
Referee: Hiroyuki Kimura (Japan)

27 December 2015
18:30

India	4–1	Nepal
Borges 26'; Chhetri 68'; Chhangte 81', 90'	Report	Magar 3'

Trivandrum International Stadium, Thiruvananthapuram
Attendance: 8,093
Referee: Jameel Juma Abdulhusain (Bahrain)

=== Group B ===
Pos	Team	Pld	W	D	L	GF	GA	GD	Pts	Status
1	Afghanistan	3	3	0	0	11	1	+10	9	Qualified for semi-finals
2	Maldives	3	2	0	1	7	6	+1	6	Qualified for semi-finals
3	Bangladesh	3	1	0	2	4	7	−3	3	
4	Bhutan	3	0	0	3	1	9	−8	0	

Source: soccerway.com
24 December 2015
15:30

Maldives	3–1	Bhutan
Imaz 9'; Abdulla 31'; Ashfaq 70'	Report	Dorji 20'

Trivandrum International Stadium, Thiruvananthapuram
Attendance: 4,000
Referee: Sudish Pandey (Nepal)
24 December 2015
18:30

Afghanistan	4–0	Bangladesh
Saighani 30'; Shayesteh 32'; Amiri 40'; Amani 69'	Report

Trivandrum International Stadium, Thiruvananthapuram
Attendance: 150
Referee: Pranjal Banerjee (India)

26 December 2015
15:30

Bangladesh	1–3	Maldives
Biswas 86'	Report	Ashfaq 42' (pen.); Hassan 90'; Nashid 90+5'

Trivandrum International Stadium, Thiruvananthapuram
Attendance: 3,654
Referee: Võ Minh Trí (Vietnam)
26 December 2015
18:30

Bhutan	0–3	Afghanistan
	Report	Amani 14', 51'; Saighani 42'

Trivandrum International Stadium, Thiruvananthapuram
Attendance: 1,817
Referee: Nivon Robesh Gamini (Sri Lanka)

28 December 2015
15:30

Bhutan	0–3	Bangladesh
	Report	Barman 8'; Rony 24' (pen.), 67'

Trivandrum International Stadium, Thiruvananthapuram
Attendance: 218
Referee: Pranjal Banerjee (India)
28 December 2015
18:30

Afghanistan	4–1	Maldives
Shayesteh 20'; Popalzay 34', 54'; Hatifi 51'	Report	Fasir 32'

Trivandrum International Stadium, Thiruvananthapuram
Attendance: 1,751
Referee: Nivon Robesh Gamini (Sri Lanka)

== Knockout phase ==
=== Bracket ===
Semi-finals
31 Dec – Thiruvananthapuram
India	3
Maldives	2
31 Dec – Thiruvananthapuram
Afghanistan	5
Sri Lanka	0

Final
3 Jan – Thiruvananthapuram
India (a.e.t.)	2
Afghanistan	1

=== Semi-finals ===
31 December 2015
15:30

India	3–2	Maldives
Chhetri 25'; Lalpekhlua 34', 66'	Report	Nashid 45+2'; Amdhan Ali 75'

Trivandrum International Stadium, Thiruvananthapuram
Attendance: 31,716
Referee: Võ Minh Trí (Vietnam)

31 December 2015
18:30

Afghanistan	5–0	Sri Lanka
Hashemi 45+1'; Taher 50'; Amani 56' (pen.); Hatifi 78'; Shayesteh 89'	Report

Trivandrum International Stadium, Thiruvananthapuram
Attendance: 300
Referee: Sudhish Pandey (Nepal)

=== Final ===
3 January 2016
18:30

India	2–1 (a.e.t.)	Afghanistan
Lalpekhlua 72'; Chhetri 101'	Report	Amiri 70'

Trivandrum International Stadium, Thiruvananthapuram
Attendance: 40,500
Referee: Hiroyuki Kimura (Japan)

== Champion ==
SAFF Championship 2015

India
Seventh title

== Awards ==
The following awards were given for the 2015 SAFF Championship.

Fair Play Award	Most Valuable Player	Golden Boot Award
Maldives	(India) Sunil Chhetri	(Afghanistan) Khaibar Amani

== Goalscorers ==
4 goals

- (Afghanistan) Khaibar Amani

3 goals

- (Afghanistan) Faysal Shayesteh
- (India) Jeje Lalpekhlua
- (India) Sunil Chhetri

2 goals

- (Afghanistan) Masih Saighani
- (Afghanistan) Omid Popalzay
- (Afghanistan) Ahmad Hatifi
- (Bangladesh) Shakhawat Hossain Rony
- (India) Lallianzuala Chhangte
- (India) Robin Singh
- (Maldives) Ali Ashfaq
- (Maldives) Ahmed Nashid

1 goal

- (Afghanistan) Zubayr Amiri
- (Afghanistan) Sayed Mohammad Hashemi
- (Afghanistan) Kanischka Taher
- (Bangladesh) Hemanta Vincent Biswas
- (Bangladesh) Topu Barman
- (Bhutan) Tshering Dorji
- (India) Rowllin Borges
- (Nepal) Bimal Magar
- (Maldives) Ahmed Imaz
- (Maldives) Asadhulla Abdulla
- (Maldives) Amdhan Ali
- (Maldives) Naiz Hassan
- (Sri Lanka) Mohamed Rifnas

== Team statistics ==
This table shows all team performance.

Pos	Team	Pld	W	D	L	GF	GA	GD	Pts
Final
1	India	4	4	0	0	11	4	+7	12
2	Afghanistan	5	4	0	1	17	3	+14	12
Semi-finals
3	Maldives	4	2	0	2	9	9	0	6
4	Sri Lanka	3	1	0	2	1	7	-6	3
Eliminated in the group stage
5	Bangladesh	3	1	0	2	4	7	−3	3
6	Nepal	2	0	0	2	1	5	−4	0
7	Bhutan	3	0	0	3	1	9	−8	0

== Controversies ==
During the first match of the tournament, both Sri Lanka and Nepal were wearing the same dark red jersey in the first half before Nepal changed into their blue second-kit for the second half.

== Sponsorship ==
On 14 September 2015 it was announced that Suzuki would be the title sponsor of the SAFF Championship for 2015.
