= Kariavattom =

Karyavattom
- locality
- Location in Kerala, India
- Coordinates: 8°34′0″N 76°53′0″E
- Country: India
- State: Kerala
- District: Thiruvananthapuram

Government
  - Body: Trivandrum Corporation

Languages
  - Official: Malayalam, English
- Time zone: UTC+5:30 (IST)
- PIN: 695581
- Telephone code: +91 471-XXXXXXX
- Vehicle registration: KL-22
- Nearest city: Thiruvananthapuram
- Lok Sabha constituency: Thiruvananthapuram

Kariavattom is an area of Trivandrum city the capital of Kerala, India. Trivandrum International Stadium the largest international stadium of Kerala is situated in Karyavattom.

== Geography ==
(കാര്യവട്ടം) is approximately 14 km north of Thiruvananthapuram on NH 47, between Pangappara (പാങ്ങപ്പാറ) and Kazhakuttam (കഴക്കൂട്ടം). It is about 3 km from Sreekariyam (ശ്രീകാര്യം) and 2 km from Kazhakkoottam. Kariyavattom is Located In 2 Villages Kazhakkoottam village in west, Pangappara village in east.

The traditional account of how the place got its name is that the Ettuveettil Pillamar (എട്ടുവീട്ടീല്‍ പിള്ളമാര്‍) (Pillais from the eight houses) who rebelled against the would-be Prince Marthandavarma (മാര്‍ത്താണ്ഡവര്‍മ്മ) (later King of Travancore) used to meet in a place near the Lord Ayyappa temple located near Kariavattom. It is believed that they used to sit in a circle and discuss matters of importance and hence the name Kariavattom. (Karya means matter and vattom means circle.) Another claim about the name is that the Karyam in Karyavattom is attached to the Karyakkar of Kazhakkoottam temple. Settlements of Karyakkars are found in Sreekaryam and also Kariyam (now part of Trivandrum Corporation) which is Sree Narayana Guru's birthplace about 5 km from Kariavattom. Kariavattom includes the locality of Viyyat, where the Sree Viyyat Devi Kshethram temple, dedicated to Sree Saraswathi Devi, Sree Chamundeswari Devi and Sree Ganapathi Bhagavan, is located.

The Postal Index Number (PIN) Code is 695581.

== Education ==
The town is home to some of the prominent educational institutions like University of Kerala post graduate section, Govt.College, Kariavattom, Engineering College[Kerala University], University College of Engineering as well as the L.N.C.P.E Lakshmibai National College of Physical Education.

In proper Kariavattom (i.e.near Kariavattom Jn) there are three schools: Govt. UPS, SDA School, Mar Gregorious.

== Economy ==
Technopark, India's largest IT and electronics industrial park, is located in Kariavattom. The Trivandrum International Stadium (Greenfield Stadium) was inaugurated on 26 January 2015; it is the first stadium in the country coming up on DBOT (Design-Build- Operate and Transfer) basis.

== Religion ==
Hinduism is the predominant religion. The Kariavattom Sastha Temple is dedicated to lord Ayyappa and it lies on the NH-49 (Kanyakumari-Salem highway).
