= Greenfield International Stadium =

Indian sports stadium

Greenfield International Stadium Thiruvananthapuram
- Thiruvananthapuram International Stadium

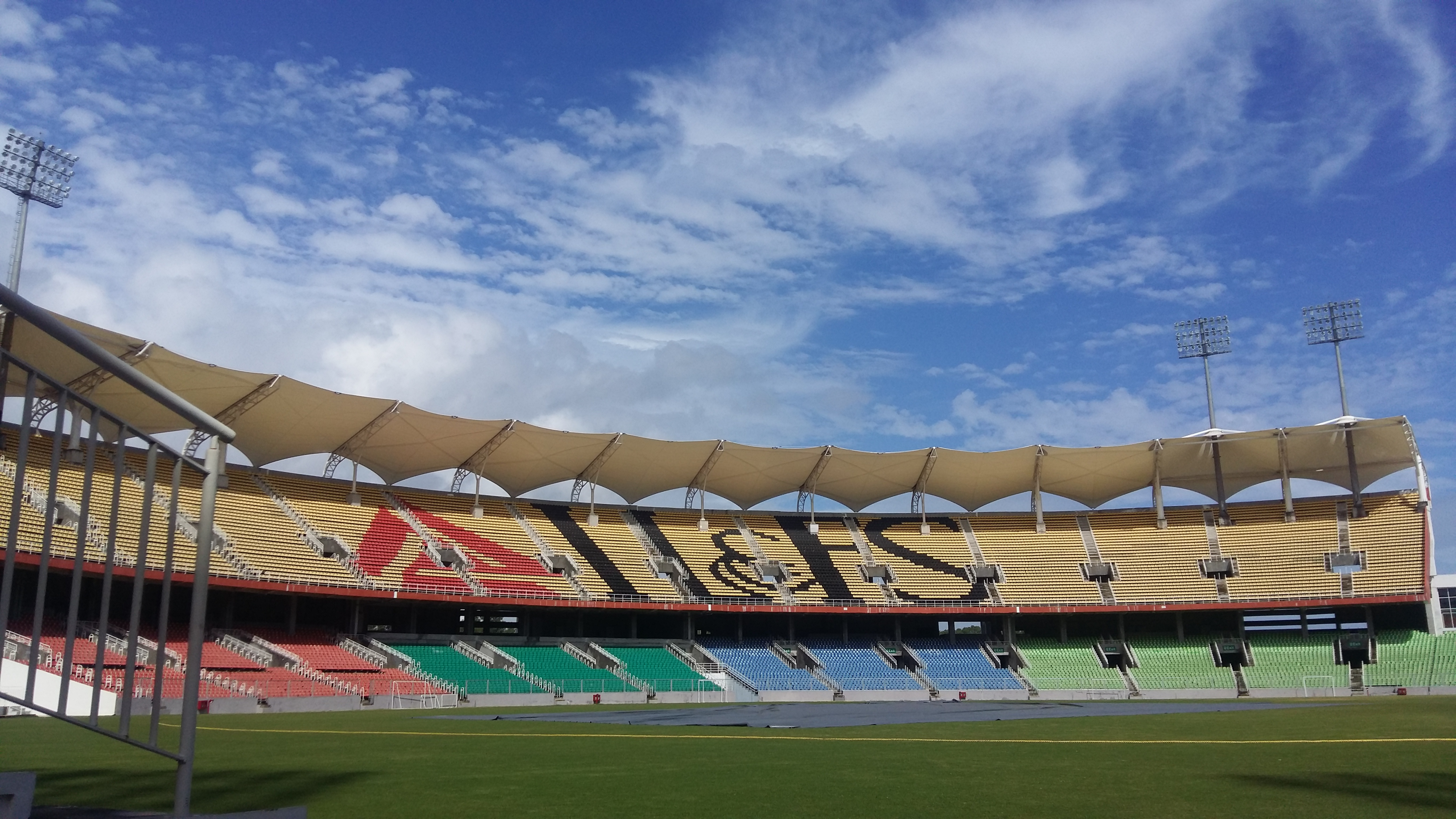
- Interactive map of Greenfield International Stadium Thiruvananthapuram
- Location: Opposite University of Kerala Kariavattom Campus, Thiruvananthapuram, Kerala, India.
- Coordinates: 8°34′17.4″N 76°53′03.5″E
- Owner: University of Kerala
- Operator: Kariavattom Sports Facilities Limited (KSFL), Kerala Cricket Association
- Capacity: 50,000
- Surface: Grass

Construction
- Groundbreaking: 2012; 14 years ago
- Built: 2015; 11 years ago
- Opened: 26 January 2015; 11 years ago
- Cost: ₹390 crore (US$40 million)
- Architects: Collage Design, Mumbai
- Main contractors: Infrastructure Leasing & Financial Services Limited (IL&FS)

Website
- thesportshub.in

Ground information
- Tenants: Indian National Cricket Team (2017–present); Indian National Football Team (selected matches); Kerala State Cricket Team (2018–present)

International information
- First men's ODI: 1 November 2018: India v West Indies
- Last men's ODI: 27 September 2026: India v West Indies
- First men's T20I: 7 November 2017: India v New Zealand
- Last men's T20I: 31 January 2026: India v New Zealand
- First women's T20I: 26 December 2025: India v Sri Lanka
- Last women's T20I: 30 December 2025: India v Sri Lanka
- As of 30 December 2025; Source: ESPNcricinfo

The Greenfield International Stadium Thiruvananthapuram, officially known as The Sports Hub, Thiruvananthapuram, is a multi-purpose international stadium located in Kariavattom, Thiruvananthapuram (Trivandrum), Kerala, India. Built on 36 acres of land leased from the University of Kerala, it is the country's first DBOT (Design, Build, Operate, and Transfer) model outdoor stadium, boasting a seating capacity of approximately 50,000 spectators. Primarily utilized for international cricket and association football, the world-class facility is recognized as India's first fully eco-friendly stadium. It has hosted key sporting events, including the 2015 SAFF Championship and various high-profile international cricket fixtures, and was awarded the prestigious David Vickers Award for New Venue of the Year at the 2016 Stadium Business Awards in Madrid, Spain.

== Facilities ==
The playing arena has been constructed in line with FIFA and International Cricket Council norms. It has a seating capacity for 50,000 spectators.

The stadium has been demarcated into four zones, where the north zone is dedicated to cricket, the east zone for football and each zone has a players' lounge, gymnasium, media center, and stock room. Shopping malls and a food court are placed in the south zone. The adjoining Pavilion accommodates the latest facilities for squash, volleyball, basketball, table tennis, and an Olympic size swimming pool.

The first fully eco-friendly stadium in India, it is surrounded by green plants and also has a rainwater harvesting facility. The State Environment Impact Assessment Authority and Pollution Control Board have commended the builders for the green initiatives taken.

The stadium is 13.3 km from Thiruvananthapuram International Airport, 10.2 km from Thiruvananthapuram North Railway Station, 14.4 km from Thiruvananthapuram Central Railway Station and Central Bus Station Thiruvananthapuram.

== Cricket at the Venue ==
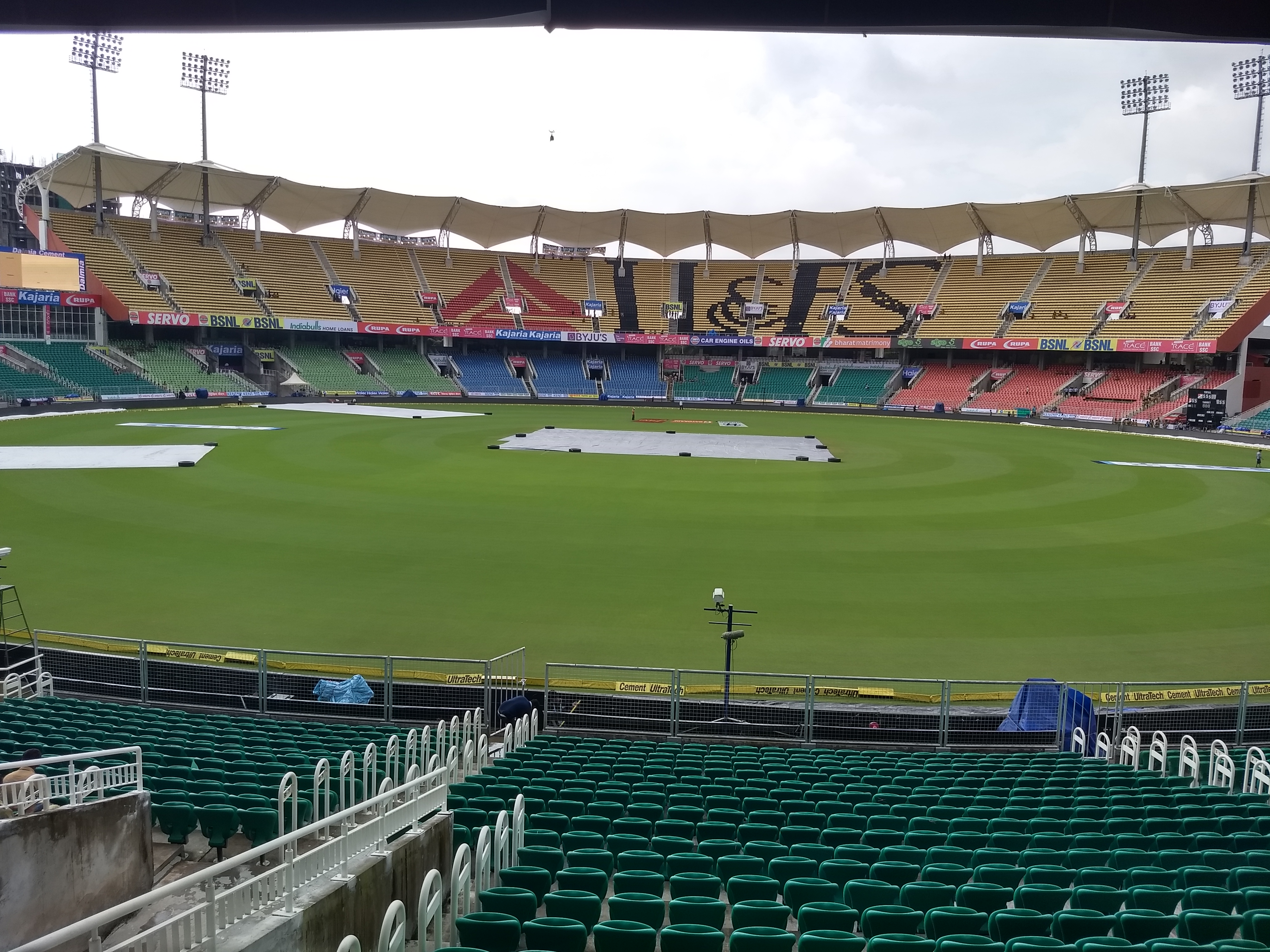
Greenfield stadium just before the Twenty20 International cricket match between India and New Zealand on 7 November 2017

On 27 May 2016, the Kerala Cricket Association (KCA) signed an agreement with Kariyavattom Sports Facilities Limited (KSFL) to take Greenfield Stadium on lease until 18 November 2027. According to the agreement, the KCA will be using the stadium for 180 days a year (from 1 October to 31 January and from 1 April to 30 May). However, the KCA can still hold cricket matches on other days if the stadium is available. The KCA will be held responsible for the maintenance of the playing area inside the stadium. The KCA will pay a fixed amount as fees and will share revenue with KSFL when international matches are held at the stadium. A joint committee consisting of six members, three each from KCA and KSFL, will manage and monitor the activities during the lease period. The KCA members in the committee will be its secretary and president. The square boundaries are approximately 65 metres, while the straighter boundaries are approximately 70 metres.

== International Men's cricket matches ==
=== 1st ODI ===
On 1 November 2018, India played against West Indies in an ODI, the second international game to be played at the ground, with the home team winning by 9 wickets.

1 November 2018
13:30 (D/N)
Scorecard

| West Indies; 104 (31.5 overs) | v | India; 105/1 (14.5 overs) |
| Jason Holder 25 (33); Ravindra Jadeja 4/34 (9.5 overs) | | Rohit Sharma 63* (56); Oshane Thomas 1/33 (4 overs) |

India won by 9 wickets
Greenfield International Stadium, Thiruvananthapuram
Umpires: Anil Chaudhary (Ind) and Paul Wilson (Aus)
Player of the match: Ravindra Jadeja (Ind)

- West Indies won the toss and elected to bat.
- This was the first ODI to be played at this venue.
- This was the West Indies' lowest total against India in ODIs.

=== 2nd ODI ===
On 15 January 2023, India played against Sri Lanka in an ODI, the second ODI game to be played at the ground, with the home team winning by 317 runs.

15 January 2023
14:00 (D/N)
Scorecard

| India; 390/5 (50 Overs) | v | Sri Lanka; 73/9 (22 Overs) |
| Virat Kohli166 (110); Kasun Rajitha81/2 | | Nuwanidu Fernando19 (27); Mohammed Siraj 32/4 |

India won by 317 runs
Greenfield International Stadium, Thiruvananthapuram
Umpires: Jayaraman Madanagopal (IND) and Nitin Menon (IND)
Player of the match: Virat Kohli (Ind)

- India won the toss and elected to bat.
- This was the Second ODI to be played at this venue.

=== 1st T20I ===
On 7 November 2017, India played a T20I against New Zealand on the ground. The match was reduced to 8 overs per side due to rain, with India winning by 6 runs.

7 November 2017
19:00 (D/N)
Scorecard

| India; 67/5 (8 overs) | v | New Zealand; 61/6 (8 overs) |
| Manish Pandey 17 (11); Tim Southee 2/13 (2 overs) | | Colin de Grandhomme 17* (10); Jasprit Bumrah 2/9 (2 overs) |

India won by 6 runs
Greenfield International Stadium, Thiruvananthapuram
Player of the match: Jasprit Bumrah (Ind)

- New Zealand won the toss and elected to field.
- The match was reduced to 8 overs per side due to rain.

=== 2nd T20I ===
On 8 December 2019, India played against West Indies in a T20I. The match was won by West Indies.

8 December 2019
19:00 (D/N)
Scorecard

| India; 170/7 (20 overs) | v | West Indies; 173/2 (18.3 overs) |
| Shivam Dube 54 (30); Hayden Walsh Jr. 2/28 (4 overs) | | Lendl Simmons 67* (45); Ravindra Jadeja 1/22 (2 overs) |

West Indies won by 8 wickets
Greenfield International Stadium, Thiruvananthapuram
Umpires: Anil Chaudhary (Ind) and C. K. Nandan (Ind)
Player of the match: Lendl Simmons (WI)

- West Indies won the toss and elected to field.

=== 3rd T20I ===
On 28 September 2022, India played against South Africa in a T20I. The match was won by India.

28 September 2022
19:30 (D/N)
Scorecard

| South Africa; 106/8 (20 overs) | v | India; 110/2 (16.4 overs) |
| Keshav Maharaj 41 (35); Arshdeep Singh 3/32 (4 overs) | | KL Rahul 51* (56); Kagiso Rabada 1/16 (4 overs) |

India won by 8 wickets
Greenfield International Stadium, Thiruvananthapuram
Umpires: Anil Chaudhary (Ind) and Nitin Menon (Ind)
Player of the match: Arshdeep Singh (IND)

- India won the toss and elected to field.

=== 4th T20I ===
On 26 November 2023, India played against Australia in a T20I. The match was won by India.

26 November 2023
19:30 (D/N)

| India; 235/4 (20 overs) | v | Australia; 191/9 (20 overs) |
| Ruturaj Gaikwad 58 (43); Nathan Ellis 3/45 (4 overs) | | Marcus Stoinis 45 (25); Ravi Bishnoi 3/32 (4 overs) |

India won by 44 runs
Greenfield International Stadium, Thiruvananthapuram
Umpires: Jayaraman Madanagopal (Ind) and KN Ananthapadmanabhan (Ind)
Player of the match: Yashasvi Jaiswal (IND)

- Australia, elected to field first.

=== ODI records ===
| Most runs | During South Africa A's tour of India 2019, Reeza Hendricks scored 239 runs at an average of 59.75 on this ground in all five unofficial ODIs. |
| Most wickets | Patel picked up 11 wickets in seven matches at this venue in List A cricket, including four against the England Lions in January 2019 and three against South Africa A a few months later. |
| Highest individual score | Virat Kohli holds the record for the best individual score at the Greenfield Stadium. He smashed 166 off 110 balls and remained unbeaten against Sri Lanka. |
| Best bowling | A five-fer by Yuzvendra Chahal against South Africa A in August 2019 was a fantastic achievement. Ravindra Jadeja, on the other hand, finished with figures of 4/34 against West Indies in ODIs, including dismissals of two of the top three batters. |
| Average 1st innings total | The Greenfield Stadium is not renowned for its batting tracks and the only ODI at this venue witnessed a low-scoring game. The average 1st innings total in List A cricket at this venue is 201. |
| Highest total | Against Sri Lanka in the third ODI, 2023, India scored 390/5 in 50 overs, powered by centuries from Virat Kohli (166) and Shubman Gill (116). |
| Lowest total | The Sri Lankans were bowled out for 73 runs in 22 overs while chasing 391 runs to win, thus recording the lowest ODI total at this venue and succumbing to the largest defeat in ODI history (by 317 runs). |

== Kerala Cricket League ==
The Greenfield International Stadium serves as the exclusive, centralized venue for the Kerala Cricket League (KCL), a premier state-level franchise T20 tournament organized by the Kerala Cricket Association (KCA) with the support of the BCCI. Since the league's inaugural season, the world-class arena has hosted all matches of the competition, drawing cricket fans from across the region to witness local talent. To elevate the spectator experience and match quality, the stadium underwent major infrastructure upgrades, including the grand inauguration of state-of-the-art LED floodlights ahead of KCL Season 2.

== Awards ==
The Sports Hub, Trivandrum was adjudged as the winner of the David Vickers Award for New Venue of the Year, in the Stadium Business Awards 2016 held at the Santiago Bernabéu Stadium, Madrid, Spain on 1 June 2016.

== See also ==
- List of association football stadiums by capacity
- List of stadiums in India
- List of international cricket grounds in India
