= Chencho Gyeltshen =

Bhutanese footballer (born 1996)

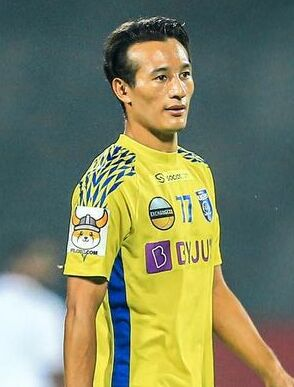
- Chencho playing for Kerala Blasters in 2021

Personal information
- Full name: Chencho Gyeltshen
- Date of birth: 10 May 1996 (age 30)
- Place of birth: Shapa Gewog, Bhutan
- Height: 1.73 m (5 ft 8 in)
- Position: Forward

Senior career*
Years	Team	Apps	(Gls)
2008–2014	Yeedzin	35	(17)
2014	Druk United	18	(12)
2015	Thimphu	10	(17)
2015–2016	Buriram United	2	(1)
2015	→ Surin City (loan)	11	(9)
2016	Satun United	7	(3)
2016	Thimphu	10	(15)
2016	Terton	2	(2)
2016	Chittagong Abahani	7	(5)
2017	Thimphu City	14	(30)
2017–2018	Minerva Punjab	18	(7)
2018–2019	Bengaluru	9	(2)
2019	→ NEROCA (loan)	5	(2)
2020–2021	Punjab	14	(7)
2021–2022	Kerala Blasters	18	(0)
2022–2023	Paro	16	(11)
2023	Punjab	12	(3)
2023	Machhindra	7	(1)
2023	Thimphu City	3	(2)
2023–2024	Sriwijaya	17	(6)
2024	Thimphu City	3	(2)
2024	Sriwijaya	11	(5)
2024–2025	PSKC Cimahi	8	(3)
2025	Lalitpur City		
2026	Thimphu	18	(8)

International career^{‡}
2011–	Bhutan	51	(16)
- * Club domestic league appearances and goals ‡ National team caps and goals as of 8 November 2026

Chencho Gyeltshen (Dzongkha: བཙན་སྐྱོགས་རྒྱལ་མཚན; born 10 May 1996) is a Bhutanese professional footballer who plays as a forward and captains the Bhutan national team. Gyeltshen is the all-time leading goalscorer for Bhutan.

He is affectionately nicknamed CG7 or Bhutanese Ronaldo, because of his style of play similar to that of Cristiano Ronaldo. Gyeltshen is the first Bhutanese fully professional footballer.

== Early life and education ==
Chencho Gyeltshen hails from Shapa Gewog, Paro District. He started playing football in primary school, with his brother inspiring him to play. He cites Cristiano Ronaldo as the player who is his inspiration. From class six to ten, he studied in Loselling MSS and then moved to Ugyen Academy for class eleven and then attended Kelki Higher Secondary School until class XII. He originally intended to become a martial artist before deciding to stop his studies to become a professional football player.

== Club career ==
=== Yeedzin ===
From 2008 to 2014, Gyeltshen played for Yeedzin in the Bhutan National League. In 2013, he won the league championship with the club. With the club, he also finished runner-up in the 2013 King's Cup. The club was defeated by a score of 2–4 by Manang Marshyangdi of Nepal in the final despite Gyeltshen's two goal performance.

=== Druk United ===
In 2014, he played for and was captain of Druk United of the Thimphu League. He played for the team in the 2014 King's Cup and scored two goals against Indian club Mohun Bagan.

=== Thimphu ===
In 2015, Chencho Gyeltshen played for Thimphu. He made his league debut for the club against Thimphu City on 5 April. He scored seventeen goals in ten matches in the Thimphu League and finished the season as the league's top scorer.

=== Interest abroad ===
In 2014, he was offered to sign with Nepalese club Machhindra after his performance at the 2013 King's Cup and was reported to agree to join with the club but could not do so until the next year due to his studies. In early 2015, Gyeltshen went on a month-long trial with Buriram United of the Thai Premier League. He played in friendlies against several Thai teams and scored the game-winning goal in the match against Thai Premier League club Sisaket after coming on as a second-half substitute. He scored five minutes after entering the match in the 80th minute. He was originally scheduled to return to Bhutan before the friendlies but was forced to stay a few days longer when his flight was cancelled. While in Thailand, he was offered deals by Indian Super League clubs Delhi Dynamos and Pune City. However, no official offers were ever presented. The player said that if the offers had been made officially and had come a bit earlier he would have chosen to play in the ISL so that he could play alongside the stars that the league had been attracting in recent years. With Buriram, Gyeltshen also won the Coke Cup Under-19 Championship in 2015.

=== Surin City ===
In July 2015, Thai club Surin City, a reserve team of Buriram United, completed the signing of Gyeltshen from Thimphu United with the Bhutan international forward agreeing a 1.5 year contract with a monthly salary of Nu 100,000. The offer was presented to the player by Alexandre Gama, manager of the first team. With the contract, Gyeltshen became the first Bhutanese footballer to play professionally for an international club. On 7 July 2015, it was revealed that the player had actually been signed by Buriram United along with two other players and was loaned immediately to Surin City.

Gyeltshen made his league debut for Surin City on 5 July 2015 in a match against Kalasin. He was given the number 11 shirt. By 24 September 2015, he had scored eight goals in eight league matches for Surin City, including a hat-trick, after 33 rounds of the 34 round season. Surin finished in tenth position in the Northeast Division, missing out on qualification for the playoffs.

=== Nonthaburi ===
On 7 February 2016, it was announced that Gyeltshen would go on loan to Nonthaburi, also of the Thai Division 2.

=== Satun United ===
Less than a month after it was announced that he would join Nonthaburi, it was announced that Gyeltshen had terminated his contract with Buriram United and signed a 2-year contract with Satun United. Following the season, it was announced that Gyeltshen was leaving the club.

=== Return to Thimphu ===
Following his departure from Satun United, Gyeltshen returned to Bhutan and signed for former club Thimphu. He made his first appearance back for the club on 2 July in the team's opening match against Thimphu City. He scored his first goal back for the club on the following matchday in a match against Ugyen Academy. In his first season with the club, Gyeltshen was the top scorer in the Bhutan National League with 15 goals in 10 league matches.

=== Terton ===
Following the 2016 season, it was announced that Gyeltshen would be joining Bhutan National League Champions Terton for their 2017 AFC Cup qualification campaign. He started the club's first match of qualification, a 0–0 draw with Tatung of Taiwan. In the team's next match, Gyeltshen scored two goals as Terton defeated Sheikh Russel of Bangladesh 4–3 to win their group and advance to the qualifying playoff group alongside Dordoi Bishkek and Three Star Club.

=== Chittagong Abahani ===
In October 2016, it was announced that Gyeltshen would join Chittagong Abahani of the Bangladesh Premier League for the second leg of the 2016 season on an initial 3-month contract. He was spotted by the club during Bangladesh's two-leg series against Bhutan during 2019 AFC Asian Cup qualification in which he scored a brace in the second match to help win the series 3–1 on aggregate. With a reported monthly salary of at least US $4,000 or Nu 270,000 Gyeltshen became the highest paid athlete in the country. Prior to signing with Chittagong, he also received a contract offer from Uttar Baridhara, another Bangladesh Premier League club. The offer was reportedly worth half of the value of his deal with Chittagong. He made his debut for the club on 7 November 2016 in a league match against Mohammedan Dhaka. The match ended in a 1–0 victory. Gyeltshen scored his first goal for the club on 23 November 2016 in his second appearance for the club, a 2–0 victory over Uttar Baridhara SC. On 30 December 2016 it was announced that Gyeltshen's stint with the club had ended and that he would return to Bhutan. In total, he scored 5 goals in 7 league matches with the club.

=== Thimphu City ===
In January 2017, it was announced that Gyeltshen would be part of Thimphu City's squad for their 2017 AFC Cup qualifying play-off match against Club Valencia of the Maldives on 31 January. He appeared in the eventual 0–0 draw as a 50th-minute substitute for Lungtok Dawa. Thimphu City replaced Terton which advanced to the qualifying play-off by winning their group during the qualifying round. Thimphu City were the first Bhutanese team to compete at this advanced of a stage in the tournament. He started in the away leg and played the entire 90 minutes but Thimphu City was eliminated with the 0–3 defeat at the National Stadium in Malé.

During the 2017 Thimphu League season, Gyeltshen scored 22 goals in 14 league matches, making him the league's top scorer for the second consecutive season. Thimphu City were also champions of the league that season. The club went on to earn second place in the 2017 Bhutan National League behind Transport United.

=== Minerva Punjab ===
In August 2017, it was announced that Gyeltshen joined Indian I-League side Minerva Punjab on an initial 1-year deal until May 2018. He joined the club on 18 October to begin preseason training prior to the 2017–18 season. Gyeltshen made his debut for the club on 31 October against reigning champions of the Punjab State Super Football League Rail Coach Factory FC in a preseason friendly. Eight days later he scored a hattrick for the club in a 3–2 preseason victory over powerhouse Bengaluru. He became a key figure in the Minerva side as they mounted a surprise title challenge, winning the title with a victory over Churchill Brothers on the final matchday.

=== Bengaluru ===
In June 2018, it was announced that Gyeltshen joined Indian Super League side Bengaluru on an initial one-year deal until May 2019. An acrobatic overhead-kick in the injury-time by Gyeltshen saved the day for Bengaluru which held host NorthEast United FC to a 1–1 draw in a match

==== NEROCA (loan) ====
In January 2019, Chencho was loaned to I-league club NEROCA from Bengaluru FC until end of the season.

=== Paro ===
On 28 December 2019, Gyeltshen joined his home town club Paro.

=== Return to Punjab ===
On 22 October 2020, Gyeltshen re-signed for Punjab on a two-year deal.

=== Kerala Blasters ===
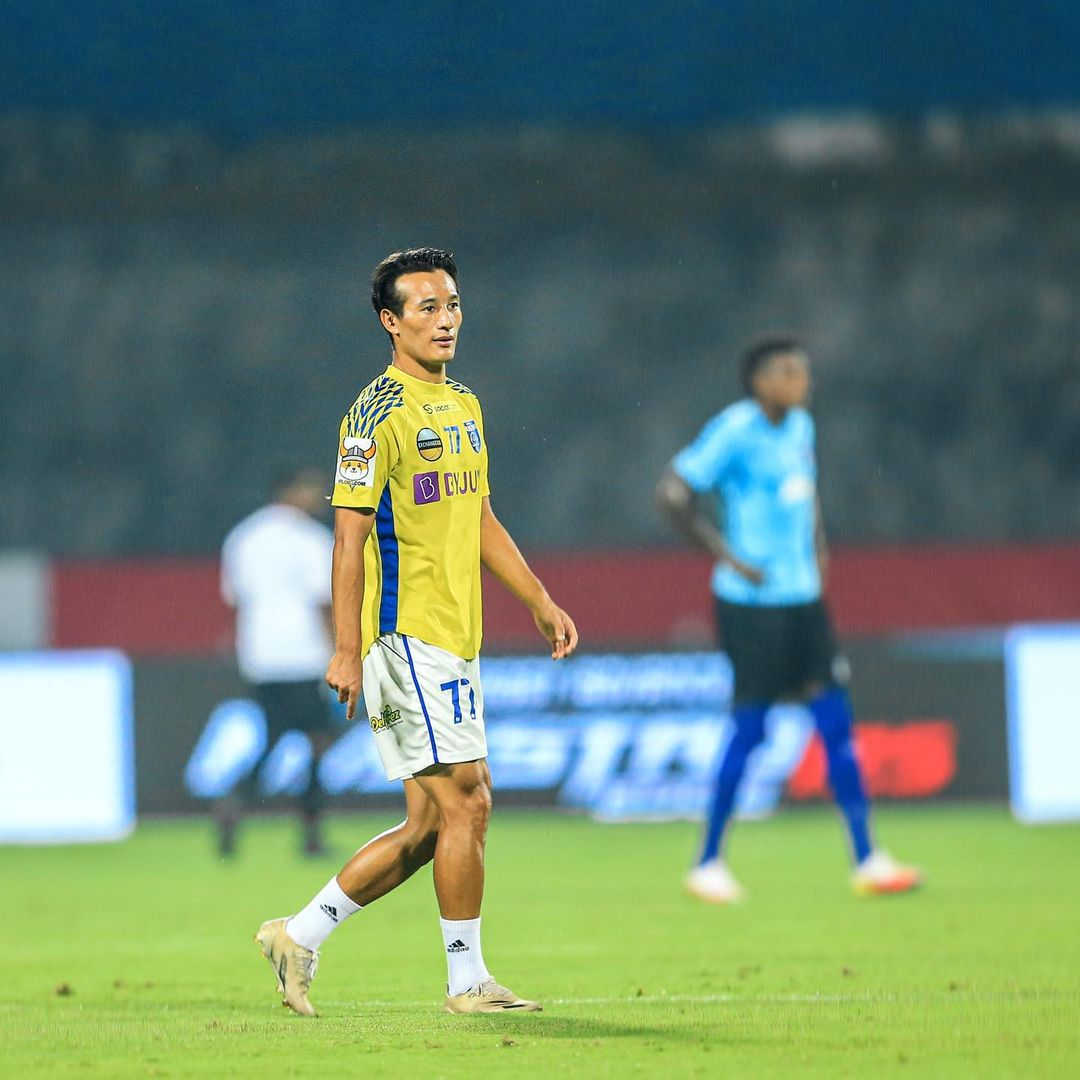
Chencho at Kerala Blasters.

On 31 August 2021, Gyeltshen joined Kerala Blasters on his return to the Indian Super League. He was included in the Blasters squad for the 2021 Durand Cup, and made his debut for the club on 21 September 2021 against Delhi FC in the Durand Cup, which they lost 1–0. Gyeltshen played his first league match for the club in the 2021–22 Indian Super League season opener on 19 November against ATK Mohun Bagan FC as a substitute for Sahal Abdul Samad, which they lost 4–2. He made his first start of the season on 23 February 2022 in the match against Hyderabad, which ended in a 2–1 defeat for the Blasters.

=== Third stint in Punjab ===
On 13 January 2023, Gyeltshen returned again in the I-League with Punjab on a season-long deal. He was part of the team that won their second I-League title in 2022–23 season, and secured promotion to 2023–24 Indian Super League.

=== Machhindra ===
In March 2023, it was announced that Gyeltshen was set to sign with two-time Nepalese champions Machhindra, a club that looked to sign the player since 2014.

=== Sriwijaya ===
On 1 August 2023, Gyeltshen moved outside of South Asia for a second time to play in Southeast Asian country, Indonesia, by signing a contract with Liga 2 side Sriwijaya FC Palembang for the 2023–24 Liga 2 season. He is the first player from Bhutan to play in the Indonesian League. He scored a goal in his debut match against Sada Sumut on 10 September 2023 which ended with Sriwijaya winning 2–0.

On 6 October 2024, upon his return to the club, he scored a quattrick to help his team to a 5–1 win over Persikabo 1973.

== International career ==
Gyeltshen has represented Bhutan at the U12, U13, U15, U17, and U19 levels. In 2007, he was selected to play for the U13 team after noticing the team practice while he walked home from school.

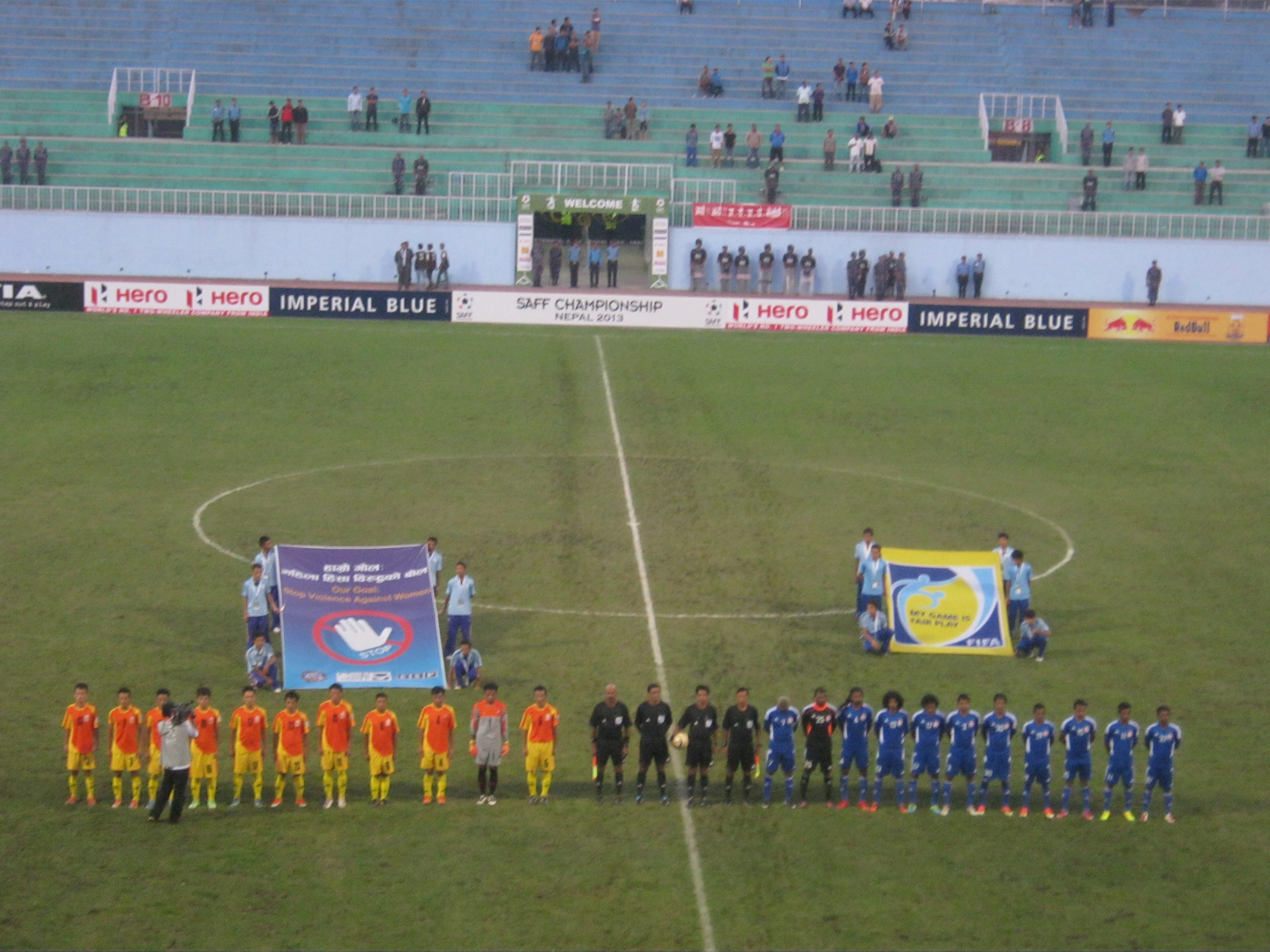
Bhutan in orange at SAFF.

Gyeltshen scored on his senior début for Bhutan on 19 March 2011 in a friendly against fellow Himalayan state Nepal. On 12 March 2015, he and the rest of the Bhutan team recorded its first World Cup qualification win in history with a 1–0 victory over Sri Lanka. In the second leg of the series at Bhutan's national Changlimithang Stadium, Gyeltshen scored twice, with his first goal coming in the fifth minute as he lifted the ball over Sri Lanka's onrushing goalie and into the far corner of the net. With the score tied 1–1 in second half stoppage time, Gyeltshen dribbled away from the goal box in the left corner of the penalty area, spun, and struck a shot that eluded two defenders and the goalkeeper as it slipped into the near corner. The victory and reaching the second round of qualification for the first time while being ranked the lowest team in the world was described by the team as "a historic moment to remember."

== Career statistics ==
=== Club ===
Club	Season	League			Cup		Continental		Others		Total	
Club	Season	Division	Apps	Goals	Apps	Goals	Apps	Goals	Apps	Goals	Apps	Goals
Yeedzin	2012–13	Bhutan National League					3 (Note: Appearances in 2012 AFC President's Cup)	1 (Note: Goal in 2012 AFC President's Cup)	—		3	1
Yeedzin	2013	Bhutan National League					3 (Note: Appearances in 2013 AFC President's Cup)	0	6	6	9	6
Druk United	2014	Bhutan National League					—		3	2	3	2
Surin City	2015	Thai Division 4	11	8	—		—		—		11	8
Satun United	2016	Thai Division 3	7	3	?	?	—		—		7	3
Nonthaburi	2016	Thai Division 3	5	0	—		—		—		5	0
Chittagong Abahani	2016	Bangladesh Premier League	7	5	?	?	—		—		7	5
Terton	2017	Bhutan National League					2 (Note: Appearances in 2017 AFC Cup qualifying round)	2 (Note: Goals in 2017 AFC Cup qualifying round)	—		2	2
Thimphu City	2015	Bhutan Premier League	10	17			—		—		10	17
Thimphu City	2016	Bhutan Premier League	10	15			—		—		10	15
Thimphu City	2017	Bhutan Premier League	14	22			2 (Note: Appearances in 2017 AFC Cup qualifying round)	0	—		16	22
Thimphu City	2023	Bhutan Premier League	3	2	0	0	—		—		3	2
Thimphu City	2024	Bhutan Premier League	3	2			—		—		3	2
Thimphu City	Total		40	58	?	?	2	0	0	0	42	58
Paro	2020	Bhutan Premier League					4 (Note: Appearances in 2020 AFC Cup qualifying play-offs)	3 (Note: Goals in 2020 AFC Cup qualifying play-offs)	—		4	3
Paro	2022	Bhutan Premier League	16	11	?	?	—		—		16	11
Paro	Total		16	11	?	?	4	3	0	0	20	14
Punjab	2017–18	I-League	18	7	—		—		—		18	7
Punjab	2020–21	I-League	14	7	—		—		—		14	7
Punjab	2022–23	I-League	12	3	—		—		—		12	3
Punjab	Total		44	17	—		—		—		44	17
Bengaluru	2018–19	Indian Super League	9	2	—		—		—		9	2
NEROCA (loan)	2019	I-League	5	2	—		—		—		5	2
Kerala Blasters	2021–22	Indian Super League	18	0	—		—		1 (Note: Appearance in 2021 Durand Cup)	0	19	0
Machhindra	2023	Nepal A-Division	7	1	—		—		—		7	1
Sriwijaya	2023–24	Liga 2	17	6	—		—		—		17	6
Sriwijaya	2024–25	Liga 2	11	5							11	5
Sriwijaya	Total		28	11	0	0	0	0	0	0	28	11
PSKC Cimahi	2024–25	Liga 2	8	3	—		—		—		8	3
Thimphu	2026	Bhutan Premier League	18	8					4	4	22	12
Career total			223	129	—		14	6	14	12	251	147

=== International ===
As of match played 8 November 2026

Bhutan
Year	Apps	Goals
2011	4	2
2012	0	0
2013	3	1
2014	0	0
2015	12	3
2016	4	3
2017	5	1
2018	5	0
2019	4	0
2023	7	3
2024	2	0
2026	5	3
Total	51	16

==== International goals ====
Scores and results list Bhutan's goal tally first.

No.	Date	Venue	Opponent	Score	Result	Competition
1.	19 March 2011	Pokhara Rangasala, Pokhara, Nepal	Nepal	1–2	1–2	Friendly
2.	7 December 2011	Jawaharlal Nehru Stadium, New Delhi, India	Afghanistan	1–4	1–8	2011 SAFF Championship
3.	4 September 2013	Dasharath Rangasala, Kathmandu, Nepal	Maldives	2–1	2–8	2013 SAFF Championship
4.	17 March 2015	Changlimithang Stadium, Thimphu, Bhutan	Sri Lanka	1–0	2–1	2018 FIFA World Cup qualification
5.	17 March 2015	Changlimithang Stadium, Thimphu, Bhutan	Sri Lanka	2–1	2–1	2018 FIFA World Cup qualification
6.	8 October 2015	Changlimithang Stadium, Thimphu, Bhutan	Maldives	2–4	3–4	2018 FIFA World Cup qualification
7.	29 March 2016	National Stadium, Malé, Maldives	Maldives	1–0	2–4	2018 FIFA World Cup qualification
8.	10 October 2016	Changlimithang Stadium, Thimphu, Bhutan	Bangladesh	2–0	3–1	2019 AFC Asian Cup qualification
9.	10 October 2016	Changlimithang Stadium, Thimphu, Bhutan	Bangladesh	3–1	3–1	2019 AFC Asian Cup qualification
10.	14 November 2017	Changlimithang Stadium, Thimphu, Bhutan	Oman	2–4	2–4	2019 AFC Asian Cup qualification
11.	25 March 2023	Dasharath Rangasala, Kathmandu, Nepal	Laos	1–1	1–2	2023 Prime Minister's Three Nations Cup
12.	25 June 2023	Sree Kanteerava Stadium, Bangalore, India	Lebanon	1–4	1–4	2023 SAFF Championship
13.	17 October 2023	Changlimithang Stadium, Thimphu, Bhutan	Hong Kong	1–0	2–0	2026 FIFA World Cup qualification
14.	31 March 2026	Indira Gandhi Athletic Stadium, Guwahati, India	Brunei	1–1	2–1	2027 AFC Asian Cup qualification
15.	31 March 2026	Indira Gandhi Athletic Stadium, Guwahati, India	Brunei	2–1	2–1	2027 AFC Asian Cup qualification
16.	8 November 2026	National Stadium, Dhaka, Bangladesh	Sri Lanka	2–2	2–2	2026 SAFF Championship
Correct as of 8 November 2026

== Honours ==
Minerva Punjab

- 2017–18 I-League champion

Bengaluru

- 2018–19 Indian Super League champion

Kerala Blasters

- 2021–22 Indian Super League runner-up

Paro

- Bhutan Premier League champion (2022, 2023)

RoundGlass Punjab

- 2022–23 I-League champion

Lalitpur City

- 2025 Nepal Super League champion

Individual

- Bhutan National League Golden boot (2016)
- I-League Golden ball (2017–18)

== Decorations ==
- National Order of Merit (Bhutan) (17 December 2023)
