= Dawa Tshering (footballer, born 1998) =

Bhutanese footballer

Personal information
- Full name: Dawa Tshering
- Date of birth: 21 August 1998 (age 28)
- Place of birth: Trashigang, Bhutan
- Height: 1.73 m (5 ft 8 in)
- Positions: Defender; midfielder

Senior career*
Years	Team	Apps	(Gls)
2016	Druk United		
2017–2020	Transport United		
2020–2023	Thimphu City		
2023–2024	Surin Khong Chee Mool	9	(1)
2024	Samtse	14	(12)
2024–2025	Delhi	7	(0)
2025–2026	Thimphu City	8	(15)
2026	→ Fortis (loan)	4	(0)
2026	Thimphu		

International career^{‡}
2015	Bhutan U19		
2019	Bhutan U23		
2017–	Bhutan	24	(2)
- * Club domestic league appearances and goals as of 24 April 2026 ‡ National team caps and goals as of 8 November 2026

Dawa "Kuenjung" Tshering (born 10 October 2001), also known as Dawa Tshering Jr, is a Bhutanese professional footballer.

== Club career ==
In July 2020, Thimphu City signed Tshering, from Transport United with a transfer fee of Nu 250, 000. This was the highest transfer fee paid in Bhutanese football, according to the clubs president, Hishey Tshering. He was also the Most Valuable Player twice in the previous two seasons.

During the 2021 Bhutan Premier League, Tshering converted a controversial penalty against Paro Rinpung FC, leading to the opponent players aggressively confronting the referee. The game raised questions about the sportsmanship of the Rinpung players and the decision of the referee.

In January 2024, Tshering joined Thai League 3 club Surin Khong Chee Mool. He scored one goal and provided four assists in nine games in the 2023–24 Thai League 3 Northeastern Region.

In September 2024, Tshering who scored 12 goals in 14 games for Samtse in the 2024 Bhutan Premier League, joined I-League club Delhi.

In January 2026, he joined Fortis in the Bangladesh Football League on a loan.

== International career ==
Tshering represented Bhutan at youth level at both the 2019 South Asian Games and the 2016 AFC U-19 Championship qualifiers.

On 5 September 2017, he made his senior national team debut against Palestine, at the 2019 AFC Asian Cup qualification – third round.

On 10 June 2025, Tshering scored his first international goal against Brunei during the 2027 AFC Asian Cup qualification at the Hassanal Bolkiah National Stadium.

== Career statistics ==
=== International ===
As of match played 8 November 2026

Appearances and goals by national team and year
National team	Year	Apps	Goals
Bhutan	2017	3	0
Bhutan	2018	2	0
Bhutan	2019	4	0
Bhutan	2020	–	
Bhutan	2021	–	
Bhutan	2022	–	
Bhutan	2023	5	0
Bhutan	2024	3	0
Bhutan	2025	3	1
Bhutan	2026	4	1
Total		24	2

Scores and results list Bhutan's goal tally first, score column indicates score after each Tshering goal.

List of international goals scored by Dawa Kuenjung Tshering
No.	Date	Venue	Opponent	Score	Result	Competition
1	10 June 2025	Hassanal Bolkiah National Stadium, Bandar Seri Begawan, Brunei	Brunei	1–2	1–2	2027 AFC Asian Cup qualification
2	8 November 2026	National Stadium, Dhaka, Bangkladesh	Sri Lanka	1–0	2–2	2026 SAFF Championship

== Honours ==
Transport United FC

- Thimphu League/A-Division: 2017

Thimpu City FC

- Bhutan National/Premier League: 2020
