= 2019 Bhutan Premier League =

Bhutan Premier League
- Season: 2019
- Champions: Paro
- Relegated: BPL 7th–10th place
- AFC Cup: Paro
- Top goalscorer: (Cameroon) Ellon Maxwell (39 goals)

The 2019 Bhutan Premier League was the eighth season of unified league, rebranded as the Bhutan Premier League (previously the Bhutan National League), the top national football competition in Bhutan, having replaced the A-Division in 2013.

The Bhutan Football Federation implemented a new league structure for this season. The top division is named Bhutan Premier League (BPL) and has featured ten teams across the country. The second division is named Bhutan Super League (BSL) and has featured nine teams across the country, replacing Thimphu League as qualifying competition for the Premier League. The lowest division is named Dzongkhag League where teams play in their respective districts (Dzongkhags) to gain promotion to the Super League.

== Super League ==
The Bhutan Super League was played from April to June, in single round-robin format, featuring nine teams: five teams from Thimphu, one team from Paro, one team from Phuentsholing and two teams from the Bhutan Football Federation Academy.

=== Regular season ===
Pos	Team	Pld	W	D	L	GF	GA	GD	Pts	Qualification or relegation
1	High Quality United	8	7	0	1	34	9	+25	21	Qualification for Playoffs and 2019 Bhutan Premier League
2	Druk Stars	8	6	1	1	30	8	+22	19	Qualification for Playoffs and 2019 Bhutan Premier League
3	BFF Academy U-19	8	5	2	1	17	7	+10	17	Qualification for Playoffs and 2019 Bhutan Premier League
4	Druk United	8	4	1	3	21	17	+4	13	Qualification for Playoffs and 2019 Bhutan Premier League
5	Paro United	8	3	1	4	17	25	−8	10	Qualification for 2019 Bhutan Premier League (Note: Phuentsholing United also qualified for the 2019 Bhutan Premier League as Thimphu, which were originally to participate, were dissolved.)
6	Phuentsholing United	8	3	0	5	15	20	−5	9	Qualification for 2019 Bhutan Premier League
7	FC Terton	8	2	1	5	12	15	−3	7	Relegated to Dzongkhag League
8	BFF Academy U-16	8	2	0	6	13	28	−15	6	Relegated to Dzongkhag League
9	Takin	8	1	0	7	5	35	−30	3	Relegated to Dzongkhag League

Source: BFF

=== Playoffs ===
==== First semi-final ====
28 May 2019
18:00

High Quality United	3–2	Druk Stars

Changlimithang Stadium

==== Second semi-final ====
29 May 2019
18:00

BFF Academy U-19	2–1	Druk United

Changlimithang Stadium

==== Third semi-final ====
31 May 2019
18:00

Druk Stars	1–0	BFF Academy U-19

Changlimithang Stadium

==== Final ====
2 June 2019
18:00

High Quality United	4–6 (a.e.t.)	Druk Stars

Changlimithang Stadium
Referee: Phurba Wangchuk

== Premier League ==
The Bhutan Premier League began in June and ended in November, in double round-robin format, featuring top five teams of the 2018 Bhutan National League and top five teams of the 2019 Bhutan Super League. Since Thimphu were dissolved, they were replaced by Phuentsholing United.

=== Teams ===
From 2018 Bhutan National League

- Transport United
- Paro
- Thimphu City
- Ugyen Academy
- Phuentsholing United (replaced Thimphu which were dissolved)

From 2019 Bhutan Super League

- High Quality United
- Druk Stars
- BFF Academy U-19
- Druk United
- Paro United

=== Personnel and kits ===
Team	Manager	Kit manufacturer	Shirt sponsor
BFF Academy U-19	(Bhutan) Chencho Dorji	FBT	
Druk Stars	(Bhutan) Kota Namgay	Nivia	SD Eastern Bhutan Coal Company Pvt. Ltd
Druk United	(Bhutan) Pema Dorji	Nivia	
High Quality United	(Bhutan) Bumtap Pema	FBT	High Quality Thangka
Paro FC	(India) Biswajit Bhattacharya	T10 Sports	Druk Asia
Paro United	(Thailand) Otthaphong Khunjit	OCEL	
Phuentsholing United	(Bhutan) Tashi Rabten	Grand Sport	GT Trading, Madan, Dophu Transport
Thimphu City	(England) Joshua Shepherd	Nivia	Woezer Events, Jebba
Transport United	(Bhutan) Nawang Dhendup	Kelme	Kelme Bhutan
Ugyen Academy	(Bhutan) Kinley Dorji	FBT	

=== League table ===
Pos	Team	Pld	W	D	L	GF	GA	GD	Pts	Qualification or relegation
1	Paro FC (C)	18	17	0	1	98	14	+84	51	Qualification for AFC Cup preliminary round 1
2	Transport United	18	13	2	3	59	27	+32	41	
3	Thimphu City	18	11	1	6	73	19	+54	34	
4	Ugyen Academy	18	10	3	5	63	30	+33	33	
5	BFF Academy U-19	18	9	3	6	56	26	+30	30	
6	Druk United	18	9	3	6	30	26	+4	30	
7	High Quality United	18	6	1	11	50	40	+10	19	Relegated to 2020 Bhutan Super League
8	Druk Stars	18	5	2	11	37	45	−8	17	Relegated to 2020 Bhutan Super League
9	Paro United	18	2	1	15	28	137	−109	7	Relegated to 2020 Bhutan Super League
10	Phuentsholing United	18	0	0	18	21	151	−130	0	Relegated to 2020 Bhutan Super League

Source: BPL
(C) Champions
