= Tsenda Dorji =

Bhutanese footballer

Personal information
- Full name: Tsenda Dorji
- Date of birth: 12 February 1995 (age 31)
- Place of birth: Paro, Bhutan
- Position: Striker

Senior career*
Years	Team	Apps	(Gls)
2017–2019	Thimphu		
2019–2021	Thimphu City		
2022–2024	Transport United	16	(29)

International career^{‡}
2018–2025	Bhutan	9	(1)
- * Club domestic league appearances and goals ‡ National team caps and goals as of 23 October 2023

Tsenda Dorji (born 12 February 1995) is a Bhutanese professional footballer who plays as a striker.

== Club career ==
In 2017, Tsenda joined Thimphu FC after playing in various local tournaments. In the 2018 Chancellor's Cup, Tsenda represented Penchhas FC. He scored in the final, coming in a 3–5 defeat to Sherubtse College FC.

Tsenda came to prominence while playing for Transport United at the 2022 BFF President's Cup. He received Nu 50,000 for being both the Most Valuable Player and the top scorer of the tournament, as his team clinched the trophy.

On 14 September 2023, Tsenda scored his 50th goal for Transport United during a 5–2 victory over BFF Academy in the 2023 Bhutan Premier League.

== International career ==
Tsenda made his debut for the Bhutan national team, in the 2018 SAFF Championship against Bangladesh. In 2023, he was selected in the team for the Prime Minister's Three Nations Cup, in Nepal. However, was unable to play due to an injury. He was later included in the team for the 2023 SAFF Championship.

== Career statistics ==
=== Club ===
As of 15 May 2024

Club	Season	League			Continental		Total	
Club	Season	Division	Apps	Goals	Apps	Goals	Apps	Goals
Transport United	2022	Bhutan Premier League	18	16	-		18	16
Transport United	2023	Bhutan Premier League	16	19	-		16	19
Transport United	2024	Bhutan Premier League	8	7	0	0	8	7

=== International ===
As of 23 October 2023

Year		Apps	Goals
Bhutan	2018	3	0
Bhutan	2023	4	1

== International goals ==
Scores and results list Bangladesh's goal tally first.

#	Date	Venue	Opponent	Score	Result	Competition
1.	28 June 2023	Sree Kanteerava Stadium, Bangalore, India	Bangladesh	1–0	1–3	2023 SAFF Championship

== Honours ==
Transport United

- BFF President's Cup: 2022

Individual

- BFF President's Cup most valuable player: 2022
- BFF President's Cup highest hcorer: 2022
