= Kinga Wangchuk =

Bhutanese footballer (born 2002)

Personal information
- Full name: Kinga Wangchuk
- Date of birth: 19 September 2002 (age 24)
- Place of birth: Phuntsholing, Bhutan
- Position: Winger

Team information
- Current team: Paro
- Number: 11

Youth career
- 2015–2019: BFF Academy

Senior career*
Years	Team	Apps	(Gls)
2020–2021	Ugyen Academy		
2021–2022	Transport United		
2023–	Paro	16	(9)

International career^{‡}
2017	Bhutan U17		
2019	Bhutan U20		
2023–	Bhutan	11	(2)
- * Club domestic league appearances and goals ‡ National team caps and goals as of 18 November 2025

Kinga Wangchuk (born 19 September 2002) is a Bhutanese professional footballer who plays as a winger for Paro FC in the Bhutan Premier League and the Bhutan national team.

== Early life ==
Raised with four siblings, Kinga's father works at Royal Insurance Corporation of Bhutan Limited, while his mother is a full-time homemaker. Supported by his parents, he chose to leave 12th grade to pursue a career in football.

Kinga secured a place at the BFF Academy in 2015, when he was 13 years old, after attending Sonamgang Middle Secondary School in Phuntsholing. In 2017, Kinga participated in the 2017 SAFF U-15 Championship held in Nepal. He also managed to score during a 6–0 victory over Sri Lanka U17 in the group-stages.

== Club career ==
Kinga joined Ugyen Academy FC in 2020, scoring in a 3–1 victory over High Quality United FC in the club's opening game of the 2020 Bhutan Premier League.

He previously played as a guest player for Transport United FC during the 2019 AFC Cup, a club he would later go on to permanently join in 2021. He helped the club win the 2022 BFF President's Cup scoring in the final against Thimphu City FC.

Kinga represented Paro FC as a guest player during both the 2022 and 2023 editions of the AFC Cup. He eventually secured a permanent move, helped the club win the 2023 Bhutan Premier League. On 17 November 2024, he scored a goal for the Transport United against Indian club Gokulam Kerala in their 2–1 quarter-final defeat at the 40th edition of Sikkim Gold Cup.

== International career ==
Kinga represented Bhutan at youth level during both the 2020 AFC U-19 Championship qualifiers and the 2018 AFC U-16 Championship qualifiers.

On 22 June 2023, Kinga made his debut for the Bhutan national team during the 2023 SAFF Championship against Maldives.

On 8 September 2024, Kinga scored his first international goal against Bangladesh in a friendly at the Changlimithang Stadium.

== Personal life ==
Kinga has cited Paro FC teammate, Kazuo Honma, as his favourite player.

== Career statistics ==
=== International ===
As of 8 September 2024.

Bhutan
Year	Apps	Goals
2023	6	0
2024	4	1
Total	10	1

=== International goals ===
==== Youth ====
Scores and results list Bhutan's goal tally first.

No.	Date	Venue	Opponent	Score	Result	Competition
1.	20 August 2017	ANFA Complex, Lalitpur, Nepal	Sri Lanka	3–0	6–0	2017 SAFF U-15 Championship
Last updated 20 August 2017

==== Senior ====
Scores and results list Bhutan's goal tally first.

No.	Date	Venue	Opponent	Score	Result	Competition
1.	8 September 2024	Changlimithang Stadium, Thimphu, Bhutan	Bangladesh	1–0	1–0	Friendly
2.	18 November 2025	Ali Sabah Al-Salem Stadium, Farwaniya, Kuwait	Yemen	1–5	1–7	2027 AFC Asian Cup qualification
Last updated 8 September 2024

== Honours ==
Transport United

- BFF President's Cup: 2022

Paro

- Bhutan Premier League: 2022, 2023
