= 2016 Bhutan National League =

Bhutan National League
- Season: 2016
- Champions: Thimphu City
- Relegated: Bhutan U-17s, Tensung
- AFC Cup: Thimphu City
- Matches: 30
- Goals: 104 (3.47 per match)
- Top goalscorer: Chencho Gyeltshen (15 goals)
- Biggest home win: Ugyen Academy 5–0 Paro United
- Biggest away win: Bhutan Clearing 0–6 Ugyen Academy
- Highest scoring: Bhutan Clearing 1–6 Thimphu

The 2016 Bhutan National League was the fifth season of the national football competition in Bhutan, having replaced the A-Division (Bhutan) in 2013. Again, the Thimphu League provides the qualifiers from Thimphu, with the top three teams in that competition being awarded places in the National League alongside three regional teams.

== Thimphu League ==
=== Format and rules ===
The Thimphu League is a regional competition for teams from Thimphu. the competition consists of seven teams, each plays the others twice – home and away – for a total of 12 games each, over 14 game weeks. 3 points are awarded for a win, 1 point for a draw and 0 points for a loss. The league table is decided firstly on points won, then on goal difference and finally on total goals scored if the previous two are equal. The first three teams automatically qualify for the National league, the bottom two teams compete in relegation playoffs with the top two teams from the B-Division for two places in the next season's competition.

=== Competing clubs ===
Location of teams participating in the 2016 Thimphu League.
- Bhutan U-17s
- Druk Pol
- Druk Stars
- Druk United
- Tensung
- Terton
- Thimphu
- Thimphu City

=== Season summary ===
The 2016 season of the Thimphu League, previously called the Bhutan A-Division, started on April 3, 2016 and ended on June 19. Terton are defending champions and the competition has been expanded from 7 teams in 2015 with the addition of Tensung and Bhutan U-17s following the relegation of Dzongree. The 2016 Thimphu league was opened with a friendly match organised by the Bhutan Football Federation between the Legends, a team of ex-national team players, including Nado, a sixty-five year old player who represented Bhutan throughout the eighties and nineties, and the Young Stars, the national team, with the Young Stars winning 5–4.

=== League table ===
Pos	Team	Pld	W	D	L	GF	GA	GD	Pts	Qualification or relegation
1	Thimphu City (Q)	14	10	3	1	44	11	+33	33	2016 Bhutan National League
2	Thimphu (Q)	14	8	3	3	31	16	+15	27	2016 Bhutan National League
3	Druk United (Q)	14	8	2	4	28	12	+16	26	2016 Bhutan National League
4	Druk Stars	14	8	2	4	36	18	+18	26	
5	Druk Pol	14	6	2	6	21	20	+1	20	
6	Terton	14	4	2	8	26	22	+4	14	
7	Tensung (R, Q)	14	2	3	9	14	42	−28	9	Relegation
8	Bhutan U-17s (R, Q)	14	1	1	12	7	66	−59	4	Relegation

Updated to match(es) played on 19 June 2016. Source:
Rules for classification: 1) points; 2) goal difference; 3) number of goals scored.
(Q) Qualified for the phase indicated; (R) Relegated

=== Results ===
Home \ Away	U17	POL	STA	UTD	TEN	TER	THI	CIT
Bhutan U-17s		0–4	0–6	0–4	1–0	0–5	0–9	1–6
Druk Pol	4–2		0–1	1–1	1–2	2–1	5–1	1–3
Druk Stars	6–0	1–0		1–0	5–0	0–4	0–1	2–2
Druk United	5–0	0–1	3–1		3–1	1–1	5–1	1–3
Tensung	3–3	4–0	1–7	1–2		0–3	0–2	0–3
Terton	3–0	1–2	2–3	0–1	2–2		2–4	1–2
Thimphu	5–0	0–0	4–2	1–0	0–0	2–0		0–0
Thimphu City	6–0	3–0	1–1	0–2	10–0	3–1	2–1	

Updated to match(es) played on 19 June 2016. Source:
Legend: Blue = home team win; Yellow = draw; Red = away team win.

Note 1: The notion of home and away fixtures in the A-Division is moot as all games are played at Changlimithang Stadium. As such, for the purpose of this table, the first result chronologically has been deemed that team's "home" game and the second the "away" game.

== National League ==
=== Format and rules ===
The competition consists of six teams competing for the national league championship, the winner of which gains a place in the next season's. AFC Cup. Each plays the others twice – home and away – for a total of 10 games each, over 10 game weeks. 3 points are awarded for a win, 1 point for a draw and 0 points for a loss. the league table is decided firstly on points won, then on goal difference and finally on total goals scored if the previous two are equal. There is no promotion or relegation from this league.

=== Teams ===
Location of teams participating in the 2016 Bhutan National League.

A total of six teams competed in the league: three teams representing Thimphu, who qualified as a result of their final positions in the 2015 A-Division, and three teams representing other districts.

- Bhutan Clearing (representing Chukha District)
- Druk United (third place in the 2016 A-Division)
- Paro United (representing Paro District)
- Thimphu (runners-up in the 2016 A-Division)
- Thimphu City (winners of the 2016 A-Division)
- Ugyen Academy (representing Punakha District)

=== League table ===
Pos	Team	Pld	W	D	L	GF	GA	GD	Pts	Qualification
1	Thimphu City (C, Q)	10	7	1	2	25	12	+13	22	2017 AFC Cup preliminary round
2	Druk United	10	6	2	2	20	12	+8	20	
3	Ugyen Academy	10	5	1	4	23	11	+12	16	
4	Thimphu	10	5	0	5	24	14	+10	15	
5	Paro United	10	3	3	4	9	19	−10	12	
6	Bhutan Clearing	10	0	1	9	3	36	−33	1	

Source: Soccerway
Rules for classification: 1) points; 2) goal difference; 3) number of goals scored
(C) Champions; (Q) Qualified for the phase indicated

=== Results ===
Home \ Away	BCL	UTD	PAR	TPU	TPC	UGY
Bhutan Clearing		0–4	1–2	1–6	0–5	0–6
Druk United	3–0		0–0	0–4	3–4	2–1
Paro United	1–1	1–3		0–3	1–0	0–3
Thimphu	3–0	1–2	2–3		0–2	2–1
Thimphu City	3–0	1–3	1–1	3–2		4–1
Ugyen Academy	3–0	0–0	5–0	2–1	1–2	

Updated to match(es) played on 13 August 2016. Source: soccerway
Legend: Blue = home team win; Yellow = draw; Red = away team win.
