= 2018 Bhutan National League =

Bhutan National League
- Season: 2018
- Champions: Transport United
- Relegated: Thimphu (dissolved)
- AFC Cup: Transport United
- Matches: 30
- Goals: 108 (3.6 per match)
- Top goalscorer: (India) Sanatan Karmakar
- Biggest home win: Transport United 9–0 Phuentsholing United
- Biggest away win: Phuentsholing United 1–6 Paro
- Highest scoring: Transport United 6–4 Thimphu
- Longest winning run: Transport United
- Longest unbeaten run: Transport United; Paro
- Longest losing run: Phuentsholing United

The 2018 Bhutan National League was the seventh season of the Bhutan National League, the national football competition in Bhutan, having replaced the A-Division in 2013. Again, the Thimphu League provides the qualifiers from Thimphu, with the top three teams in that competition being awarded places in the National League alongside three regional teams.

== Thimphu League ==
The 2018 Thimphu League (known as the 2018 Pepsi Thimphu League for sponsorship reasons) was held between 21 April to 8 July 2018.

=== League table ===
Pos	Team	Pld	W	D	L	GF	GA	GD	Pts	Qualification or relegation
1	Transport United	14	11	2	1	42	9	+33	35	2018 Bhutan National League
2	Thimphu City	14	11	1	2	52	14	+38	34	2018 Bhutan National League
3	Thimphu	14	9	0	5	29	24	+5	27	2018 Bhutan National League
4	High Quality United	14	6	2	6	36	37	−1	20	
5	Druk United	14	6	2	6	25	32	−7	20	
6	Druk Stars	14	3	2	9	16	30	−14	11	
7	Tensung	14	2	2	10	20	51	−31	8	Relegation playoffs
8	Phuensum	14	1	3	10	10	33	−23	6	Relegation playoffs

Source: Soccerway
Rules for classification: 1) points; 2) goal difference; 3) number of goals scored.

== Paro qualifying tournament ==
=== First leg ===
13 June 2018

Paro	10–2	Paro United

=== Second leg ===
15 June 2018

Paro United	0–8	Paro

Paro won 18–2 on aggregate and qualified for national league.

== National League ==
=== Teams ===
The six participating teams were:

- Transport United (representing Thimphu)
- Thimphu City (representing Thimphu)
- Thimphu (representing Thimphu)
- Paro (representing Paro)
- Phuentsholing United (representing Phuentsholing)
- Ugyen Academy (representing Punakha)

The season started on 18 September 2018.

=== Personnel and kits ===
Team	Manager	Kit manufacturer	Shirt sponsor
Paro	(India) Biswajit Bhattacharya	T10 Sports	Druk Asia
Phuentsholing United	(Bhutan) Tashi Rabten	Nivia	Dophu, Madan
Thimphu	(Spain) José Hevia	H2H Sport	
Thimphu City	(Bhutan) Passang Tshering	Nivia	Jebba
Transport United	(Bhutan) Nawang Dhendup	Nivia	Kuenphen, Pelyab
Ugyen Academy	(Bhutan) Kinley Dorji	FBT	

=== League table ===
Pos	Team	Pld	W	D	L	GF	GA	GD	Pts	Qualification
1	Transport United (C)	10	6	1	3	26	15	+11	19	2019 AFC Cup preliminary round
2	Paro	10	6	0	4	19	12	+7	18	
3	Thimphu City	10	5	2	3	17	10	+7	17	
4	Ugyen Academy	10	5	2	3	18	12	+6	17	
5	Thimphu	10	3	0	7	19	20	−1	9	
6	Phuentsholing United	10	2	1	7	9	39	−30	7	

Updated to match(es) played on 4 November 2018. Source: FIFA
Rules for classification: 1) points; 2) Head-to-head points; 3) Head-to-head goal difference; 4) Head-to-head goals scored; 5) goal difference; 6) number of goals scored
(C) Champions
