= Yeshi Dorji =

Bhutanese professional footballer (born 2001)

Yeshi Dorji Wangdi
Personal information
- Full name: Yeshi Dorji Wangdi
- Date of birth: 10 October 2001 (age 25)
- Place of birth: Thimphu, Bhutan
- Height: 1.69 m (5 ft 6 1/2 in)
- Position: Centre forward

Team information
- Current team: North Brisbane FC

Youth career
- 2014–2017: Druk Stars

Senior career*
Years	Team	Apps	(Gls)
2018–2020	Ugyen Academy		
2020–2024	Paro	31	(36)
2025-	North Brisbane	12	(13)

International career^{‡}
2019	Bhutan U18	4	(0)
2019–2021	Bhutan U20	6	(2)
2019–	Bhutan U23	5	(1)
2019–	Bhutan	4	(0)
- * Club domestic league appearances and goals ‡ National team caps and goals as of 22 June 2023

Yeshi Dorji Wangdi (born 10 October 2001) is a Bhutanese professional footballer, Who currently plays as forward for North Brisbane FC in Australia and the Bhutan national team.

== Club career ==
Yeshi represented High Quality United during their 2020 Bhutan Super League triumph and received Nu 10,000 for being the highest goal scorer. He joined Paro FC for the Premier League phase and scored 8 goals in 10 games. Yeshi won the 2021 Bhutan Premier League with Paro and received the Bhutan Premier League Top Scorer Award along the way with 23 goals from 17 games.

In January 2020, Yeshi signed a contract with a German football agency, TF Sports, and had a successful trial with VfB Fichte Bielefeld in the Landesliga Westfalen (VII) (Germany sixth division). He was about to become the first Bhutanese to play in Europe but had to return home because of a visa issue and the ongoing COVID-19 pandemic in Bhutan. In 2021, he received an offer to play on trial in the Cypriot Second Division, but eventually turned it down due to the travel restrictions during COVID-19.

== International career ==
At the 2020 AFC U-19 Championship qualifiers, Yeshi scored as Bhutan snatched a surprising 2–1 victory over Bangladesh. He scored against Nepal in the 2019 SAFF U-18 Championship, as Bhutan trashed the hosts 3–0. Yeshi was one of the key players in the 2019 South Asian Games in Nepal where Bhutan won the silver medal. During the tournament he struck a goal against Sri Lanka in a 3–1 victory.

He made his first appearance for the Bhutan national team in 2019 against Guam during the 2022 FIFA World Cup qualifiers, and became the only footballer in the country to play all youth levels and make his senior national team debut in only 149 days.

== Career statistics ==
=== International ===
As of 28 March 2023.

Bhutan
Year	Apps	Goals
2019	1	0
2023	2	0
Total	3	0

=== Youth international goals ===
Scores and results list Bhutan's goal tally first.

No.	Date	Venue	Opponent	Score	Result	Competition
1.	22 September 2019	APF Stadium, Kathmandu, Nepal	Nepal	1–0	3–0	2019 SAFF U-18 Championship
2.	10 November 2019	Khalifa Sports City Stadium, Manama, Bahrain	Bangladesh	1–1	2–1	2020 AFC U-19 Championship qualification
3.	7 December 2019	Dasarath Rangasala Stadium, Kathmandu, Nepal	Sri Lanka	3–0	3–0	2019 South Asian Games
Last updated 30 March 2023
