= 2015 Bhutan National League =

Bhutan National League
- Season: 2015
- Champions: Terton (1st title)
- Relegated: None
- AFC Cup: Terton
- Matches: 30
- Goals: 122 (4.07 per match)
- Top goalscorer: Chencho Gyeltshen (17 goals)
- Biggest home win: Ugyen Academy 8–0 Bhutan Clearing
- Biggest away win: Bhutan Clearing 0–7 Terton
- Highest scoring: Bhutan Clearing 4–6 Ugyen Academy
- Longest winning run: Thimphu City (6 matches)
- Longest unbeaten run: Terton (10 matches)
- Longest losing run: Paro United (8 matches)

The 2015 Bhutan National League was the fourth season of national football competition in Bhutan, having replaced the A-Division (Bhutan) in 2013. Again, the A-Division provided the qualifiers, with the top three teams in that competition being awarded places in the National League alongside three regional teams. The league was sponsored by the Bank of Bhutan.

Terton were crowned champions of the national league after beating Thimphu City, who were then the top team in the league, in their final game 4–2 on 23 September.

== Thimphu League ==
The 2015 season of the Thimphu League, called the Yanmar Thimphu League for sponsorship reasons, and previously the Bhutan A-Division, started on April 4, 2015, and ended on May 13. Terton won the competition in their inaugural season, and were joined in the National League by Thimphu FC and Thimphu City.

=== Format and rules ===
The Thimphu League is a regional competition for teams from Thimphu. the competition consists of seven teams, each plays the others twice – home and away – for a total of 12 games each, over 14 game weeks. 3 points are awarded for a win, 1 point for a draw and 0 points for a loss. the league table is decided firstly on points won, then on goal difference and finally on total goals scored if the previous two are equal. The first three teams automatically qualify for the National league, the bottom two teams compete in relegation playoffs with the top two teams from the B-Division for two places in the next seasons's competition.

=== League table ===
Pos	Team	Pld	W	D	L	GF	GA	GD	Pts	Qualification or relegation
1	Terton	12	9	1	2	31	18	+13	28	2015 Bhutan National League
2	Thimphu	12	8	1	3	36	19	+17	25	2015 Bhutan National League
3	Thimphu City	12	7	2	3	42	15	+27	23	2015 Bhutan National League
4	Druk United	12	7	2	3	23	22	+1	23	
5	Druk Stars	12	5	0	7	32	31	+1	15	
6	Druk Pol	12	3	0	9	17	27	−10	9	
7	Dzongree	12	0	0	12	9	58	−49	0	

Updated to match(es) played on 23 July 2015. Source:
Rules for classification: 1) points; 2) goal difference; 3) number of goals scored.

=== Results ===
Home \ Away	POL	STA	UTD	DZO	TER	TPU	TPC
Druk Pol		3–2	2–4	4–0	1–2	2–3	1–5
Druk Stars	3–0		0–1	4–0	2–3	3–7	2–6
Druk United	2–0	0–3		5–2	1–1	1–7	3–1
Dzongree	1–4	1–6	1–2		1–7	0–2	0–12
Tertons	1–0	3–5	3–1	2–0		1–3	3–2
Thimphu	2–0	3–1	1–2	5–2	1–3		2–2
Thimphu City	2–0	4–1	1–1	5–0	1–2	1–0	

Updated to match(es) played on 23 July 2015. Source:
Legend: Blue = home team win; Yellow = draw; Red = away team win.

Note 1: The notion of home and away fixtures in the A-Division is moot as all games are played at Changlimithang Stadium. As such, for the purpose of this table, the first result chronologically has been deemed that team's "home" game and the second the "away" game.
Note 2: The Druk Pol v Thimphu FC match was also reported as a 4–2 win for Thimphu.

== National League ==
=== Format and rules ===
The competition consists of six teams competing for the national league championship, the winner of which gains a place in the next season's. AFC Cup. Each plays the others twice – home and away – for a total of 10 games each, over 10 game weeks. 3 points are awarded for a win, 1 point for a draw and 0 points for a loss. the league table is decided firstly on points won, then on goal difference and finally on total goals scored if the previous two are equal. There is no promotion or relegation from this league.

=== Teams ===
Location of teams participating in the 2015 Bhutan National League.

A total of six teams competed in the league: three teams representing Thimphu, who qualified as a result of their final positions in the 2015 A-Division, and three teams representing other districts.

- Bhutan Clearing (representing Chukha District)
- Paro United (representing Paro District)
- Terton (winners of the 2015 A-Division)
- Thimphu (runners-up in the 2015 A-Division)
- Thimphu City (third place in the 2015 A-Division)
- Ugyen Academy (representing Punakha District)

=== League table ===
Pos	Team	Pld	W	D	L	GF	GA	GD	Pts	Qualification or relegation
1	Terton (C)	10	6	4	0	29	10	+19	22	2017 AFC Cup qualifying round
2	Thimphu	10	6	3	1	22	10	+12	21	
3	Thimphu City	10	6	2	2	26	11	+15	20	
4	Ugyen Academy	10	4	2	4	25	19	+6	14	
5	Bhutan Clearing	10	1	1	8	11	37	−26	4	
6	Paro United	10	1	0	9	8	34	−26	3	

Updated to match(es) played on 23 September 2015. Source: soccerway
Rules for classification: 1) points; 2) goal difference; 3) number of goals scored.
(C) Champions

=== Results ===
Home \ Away	BCL	PAR	TER	TPU	TPC	UGY
Bhutan Clearing		3–2	0–7	1–2	0–1	4–6
Paro United	3–1		1–2	0–2	1–5	0–5
Terton	2–2	5–0		1–0	1–1	4–1
Thimphu	2–0	5–0	3–3		1–1	1–0
Thimphu City	4–0	4–1	2–4	1–3		3–0
Ugyen Academy	8–0	2–0	0–0	3–3	0–4	

Updated to match(es) played on 23 September 2015. Source: soccerway
Legend: Blue = home team win; Yellow = draw; Red = away team win.
