= 2025 Bhutan Premier League =

Bhutan Premier League
- Season: 2025
- Dates: 22 April – 9 November
- Champions: Paro
- Relegated: Samtse; Southern City
- AFC Challenge League: Paro
- Matches: 90
- Goals: 377 (4.19 per match)
- Biggest home win: RTC 10–0 Samtse
- Biggest away win: Samtse 2–10 Thimphu City
- Highest scoring: Samtse 2–10 Thimphu City

The 2025 Bhutan Premier League (known as the Bank of Bhutan Premier League for sponsorship reasons) was the 14th season of the Bhutan Premier League, the top professional football league in Bhutan.

The season featured ten teams, following a qualification round held earlier in the year to determine the final entrants. The main competition commenced in May 2025 and concluded in October 2025. Paro entered the season as the defending champions after having secured their fourth consecutive title in the previous edition.

At the conclusion of the campaign, Paro successfully defended their championship, clinching their sixth league title overall and a record-extending fifth consecutive crown. By winning the league, they also secured qualification for the preliminary stage of the 2026–27 AFC Challenge League.

== Background ==
Paro, the most successful club in the history of the Bhutan Premier League, entered the season as four-time defending champions, having secured consecutive titles in 2021, 2022, 2023, and 2024. Prior to the start of the 2025 campaign, the club had amassed a total of five league championships.

The competition was originally established as the Bhutan National League in 2012, serving as the highest level of football in the country, before being rebranded as the Bhutan Premier League in 2019. The 2025 edition marks the 14th season of the top-flight era, with the Bhutan Football Federation continuing its partnership with the Bank of Bhutan as the primary title sponsor.

== Format ==
The 2025 season followed a multi-stage structure. The initial phase consisted of the Pepsi BPL Qualifiers, where ten clubs with valid BFF and AFC club licenses competed in a single round-robin format held at a centralized venue. The top two teams from this qualifying stage—Ugyen Academy and Southern City—earned promotion to the top flight to complete the 10-team roster for the main season.

The main league phase, branded as the Bank of Bhutan Premier League, comprised ten teams: the top eight finishers from the 2024 season and the two successful qualifiers. These clubs competed in a double round-robin tournament, playing each other home and away for a total of 18 matches per team. The team finishing at the top of the table was crowned the national champion and earned qualification for the 2026–27 AFC Challenge League.

== Teams ==
Ten teams competed in the 2025 season: the top eight teams from the previous 2024 season and two teams promoted from the 2025 BPL Qualifiers. Ugyen Academy and Southern City joined the top flight, replacing Daga United and Phuntsholing Heroes.

| Team | Location | Stadium | Capacity |
|---|---|---|---|
| BFF Academy U-19 | Thimphu | Changlimithang Stadium | 15,000 |
| Paro | Paro | Woochu Sports Arena | 1,000 |
| Royal Thimphu College | Thimphu | RTC Ground | 1,000 |
| Samtse | Samtse | Samtse Dzongkhag Ground | 2,000 |
| Southern City | Gelephu | Gelephu Public Ground | 1,000 |
| Tensung | Wangdue Phodrang | MTC Ground | 1,000 |
| Thimphu City | Thimphu | Changlimithang Stadium | 15,000 |
| Transport United | Thimphu | Changlimithang Stadium | 15,000 |
| Tsirang | Damphu | Tsirang Artificial Turf | 1,000 |
| Ugyen Academy | Punakha | Ugyen Academy Ground | 1,000 |

== League table ==
| Pos | Team | Pld | W | D | L | GF | GA | GD | Pts | Qualification or relegation |
|---|---|---|---|---|---|---|---|---|---|---|
| 1 | Paro (C, Q) | 18 | 16 | 1 | 1 | 74 | 17 | +57 | 49 | Qualification for AFC Challenge League preliminary stage |
| 2 | Thimphu City | 18 | 14 | 1 | 3 | 64 | 23 | +41 | 43 | |
| 3 | RTC | 18 | 12 | 2 | 4 | 62 | 19 | +43 | 38 | |
| 4 | Transport United | 18 | 11 | 1 | 6 | 46 | 27 | +19 | 34 | |
| 5 | BFF Academy U-19 | 18 | 8 | 3 | 7 | 40 | 36 | +4 | 27 | |
| 6 | Ugyen Academy | 18 | 8 | 1 | 9 | 38 | 41 | −3 | 25 | |
| 7 | Tsirang | 18 | 4 | 4 | 10 | 21 | 42 | −21 | 16 | |
| 8 | Tensung | 18 | 3 | 2 | 13 | 17 | 48 | −31 | 11 | |
| 9 | Southern City (R) | 18 | 3 | 1 | 14 | 15 | 59 | −44 | 10 | Relegation |
| 10 | Samtse (R) | 18 | 2 | 2 | 14 | 22 | 87 | −65 | 8 | Relegation |

Rules for classification: 1) Points; 2) Goal difference; 3) Goals scored.
(C) Champions; (Q) Qualified for the phase indicated; (R) Relegated

== Results ==
| Home \ Away | BFF | PAR | RTC | SAM | SOU | TEN | THC | TRU | TSI | UGY |
|---|---|---|---|---|---|---|---|---|---|---|
| BFF Academy U-19 | — | 0–4 | 1–2 | 4–0 | 3–0 | 2–1 | 1–3 | 0–2 | 1–1 | 2–2 |
| Paro | 3–1 | — | 2–1 | 9–1 | 5–0 | 4–0 | 2–1 | 3–1 | 4–0 | 4–1 |
| RTC | 2–2 | 1–1 | — | 10–0 | 4–0 | 5–0 | 2–3 | 1–0 | 3–1 | 3–1 |
| Samtse | 1–5 | 1–6 | 0–8 | — | 2–3 | 1–2 | 2–10 | 1–6 | 1–1 | 1–4 |
| Southern City | 1–5 | 0–6 | 0–4 | 2–1 | — | 0–1 | 0–4 | 1–4 | 2–1 | 1–3 |
| Tensung | 1–3 | 1–5 | 0–4 | 1–4 | 1–1 | — | 1–4 | 1–3 | 0–2 | 0–3 |
| Thimphu City | 4–2 | 3–2 | 1–2 | 6–1 | 5–1 | 4–1 | — | 2–1 | 4–1 | 5–0 |
| Transport United | 2–3 | 0–2 | 1–2 | 4–2 | 3–1 | 3–1 | 1–1 | — | 2–0 | 4–2 |
| Tsirang | 0–2 | 1–5 | 1–1 | 3–1 | 2–1 | 0–3 | 1–4 | 1–4 | — | 2–1 |
| Ugyen Academy | 1–3 | 1–6 | 1–0 | 5–1 | 4–1 | 1–0 | 1–4 | 1–2 | 2–3 | — |

Legend: Blue = home team win; Yellow = draw; Red = away team win.
For upcoming matches, an "a" indicates there is an article about the rivalry between the two participants.

== Attendances ==
The average league attendance was 393.

| # | Team | Average |
|---|---|---|
| 1 | Paro | 713 |
| 2 | Thimphu City | 538 |
| 3 | Southern City | 457 |
| 4 | RTC | 372 |
| 5 | Tsirang | 368 |
| 6 | Transport United | 361 |
| 7 | Tensung | 324 |
| 8 | Ugyen | 283 |
| 9 | Samtse | 273 |
| 10 | BFF | 237 |
