= Jigme Tshultrim =

Bhutanese footballer

Personal information
- Full name: Jigme Tshultrim
- Date of birth: 23 February 1993 (age 33)
- Place of birth: Bhutan
- Position: Defender

Team information
- Current team: High

Senior career*
Years	Team	Apps	(Gls)
2012–2017	Yeedzin		
2017–2018	Terton		
2018–2021	High Quality United		

International career
2012–2019	Bhutan	4	(0)
- * Club domestic league appearances and goals

Jigme Tshultrim is a former Bhutanese professional footballer, who last played for High Quality United. He made his first appearance for the Bhutan national team in 2012.
