= Keisuke Honda =

Japanese football player and manager (born 1986)

Keisuke Honda 本田 圭佑
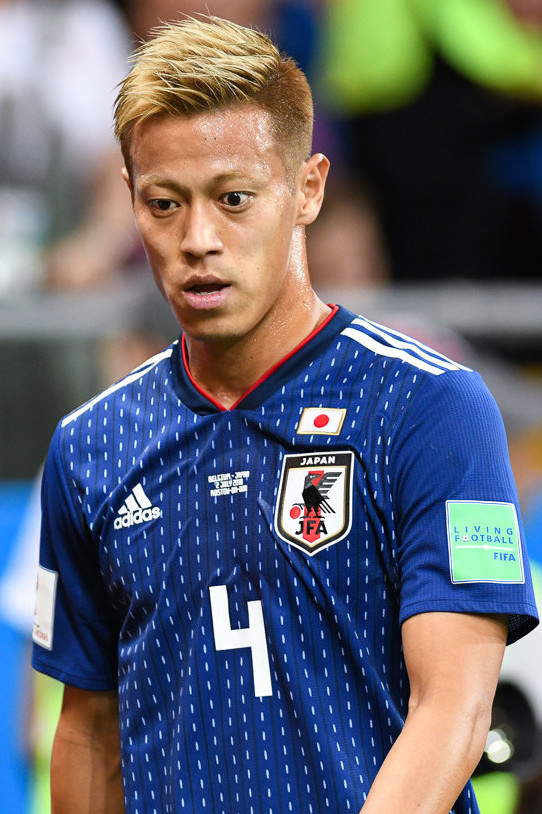
- Honda with Japan at the 2018 FIFA World Cup

Personal information
- Full name: Keisuke Honda
- Date of birth: 13 June 1986 (age 40)
- Place of birth: Settsu, Osaka, Japan
- Height: 1.82 m (6 ft 0 in)
- Position: Attacking midfielder

Team information
- Current team: Jurong
- Number: 4

Youth career
- 1994–1998: Settsu FC
- 1999–2001: Gamba Osaka
- 2002–2004: Seiryo High School

Senior career*
Years	Team	Apps	(Gls)
2004–2008	Nagoya Grampus Eight	90	(12)
2008–2009	VVV-Venlo	68	(24)
2010–2013	CSKA Moscow	94	(20)
2014–2017	AC Milan	82	(12)
2017–2018	Pachuca	30	(10)
2018–2019	Melbourne Victory	18	(8)
2019	Vitesse	4	(0)
2020	Botafogo	27	(3)
2021	Neftçi Baku	7	(2)
2021	Sūduva	6	(1)
2024	Paro	1	(0)
2026–	Jurong	1	(0)

International career
2005	Japan U20	2	(0)
2006–2008	Japan U23	18	(6)
2008–2018	Japan	98	(38)

Managerial career
- 2018–2023: Cambodia
- 2023: Cambodia U23
Medal record
Representing Japan
AFC Asian Cup
Winner	2011 Qatar
- * Club domestic league appearances and goals as of 18 September 2026

Keisuke Honda (本田 圭佑, Honda Kēsuke; born 13 June 1986) Japanese pronunciation: [ke̝sɯ̥̈ke̝ hõɴda̠] is a Japanese professional football manager and player who plays as a midfielder for Singapore Premier League side Jurong. A versatile player, Honda can also play as a winger, a false nine or a deep-lying playmaker.

Honda earned over 90 international caps between 2008 and 2018, playing at the 2010, 2014 and 2018 FIFA World Cups. He was also part of the squad which won the 2011 AFC Asian Cup, where he was voted Player of the Tournament. Honda holds the record becoming the first professional player to score a goal on six separate continents (Africa, Asia, Europe, North America, Oceania, and South America). He holds another record of becoming the first ever Asian player to have scored against a nation of every continent after scoring against Senegal in the 2018 FIFA World Cup.

== Club career ==
=== Early career ===
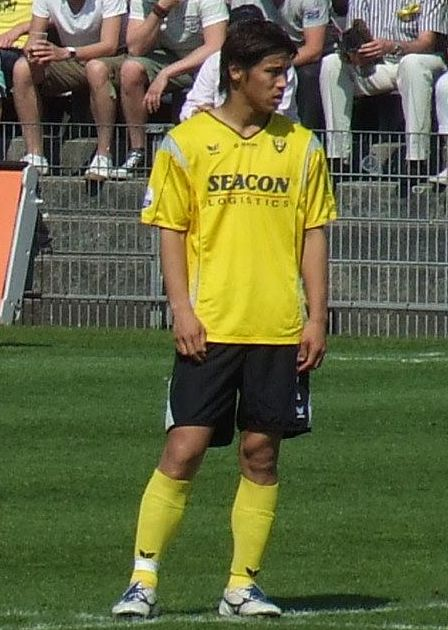
Honda playing for VVV-Venlo in 2008

Born and raised in Settsu, Honda had belonged to the local junior youth team at Gamba Osaka, but was not promoted to the youth team. When Honda was a Seiryo High School student, he made an appearance at J.League Cup as Special Designated Youth Player in 2004. After graduating high school, he began his professional career in 2005, with J1 League side Nagoya Grampus Eight.

On 16 January 2008, Honda signed a two and half-year deal with Eredivisie side VVV-Venlo. In his first six months at VVV, he experienced relegation for the first time in his professional career as his new side went down to Eerste Divisie, the second division. In the 2008–09 season, he scored 16 goals in 36 league appearances to help the team back into the Eredivisie. He became known as Keizer Keisuke (meaning Emperor Keisuke) among the club's fans. Also, Honda introduced his agent, Tetsuro Kiyooka, to Maya Yoshida in 2008 and led him to VVV-Venlo two years later.

=== CSKA Moscow ===
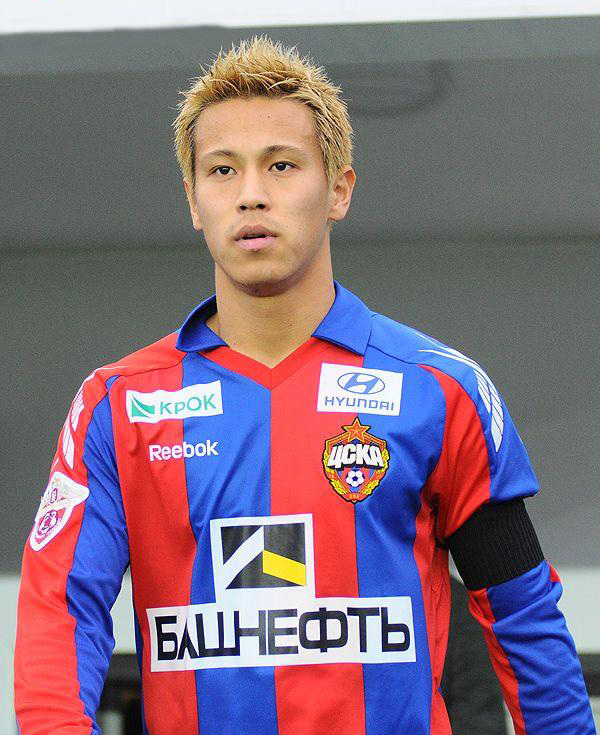
Honda with CSKA Moscow in 2010

At the end of December 2009, Honda transferred to Russian club CSKA Moscow. Honda signed a 4-year contract. The transfer fee was undisclosed, but VVV-Venlo was said to be very content with the fee as it almost matched their asking price; it is believed to be in the region of €6 million. Honda made his debut for CSKA in the UEFA Champions League match against Sevilla. In the second leg in Seville, he scored the winning goal through a direct free kick for CSKA after having set up the first goal for Tomáš Necid. This secured a 2–1 (3–2 aggregate) victory to send the club to the quarterfinals, making Honda the first Japanese player to be in the quarter-finals as well as the first to

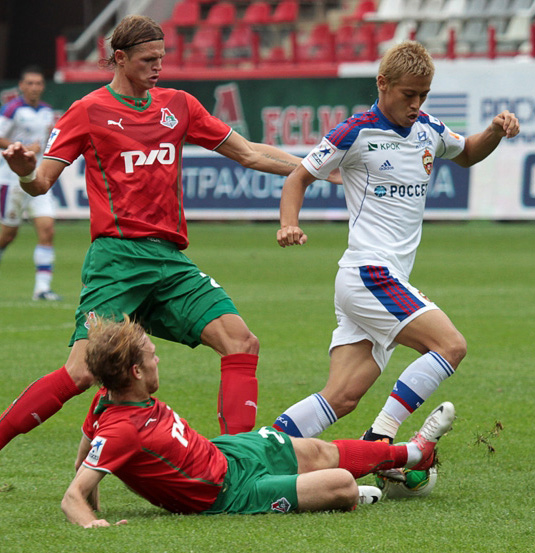
Honda in action for CSKA Moscow in 2013

score in the knock-out stages. Honda scored his first league goal on 12 March 2010, in the home match against Amkar Perm. He scored the goal in the third minute of injury time, slotting home a pass from Necid with his left. With the goal, he secured the win for CSKA Moscow.

Honda picked up his first piece of silverware with CSKA on 22 May 2011, coming on as a second-half substitute for Alan Dzagoev in a 2–1 defeat of Alania Vladikavkaz in the Russian Cup final. He netted two goals in the first half of CSKA's match against Krylia Sovetov three days later, a match that ended in a 3–0 victory for his side. On 16 September 2012, Honda scored twice off passes from Ahmed Musa, scoring the only goals in a league victory over Alania.

On 13 July 2013, Honda scored CSKA's first and third goals in the club's 3–0 victory over Zenit in the Russian Super Cup match in Rostov. In 2013 summer transfer window, he entered the final six months of his contract with CSKA and became free to talk to other clubs, expressing his interest in moving to a bigger club. On 11 December 2013, CSKA announced the conclusion of Honda's time at the club.

=== AC Milan ===
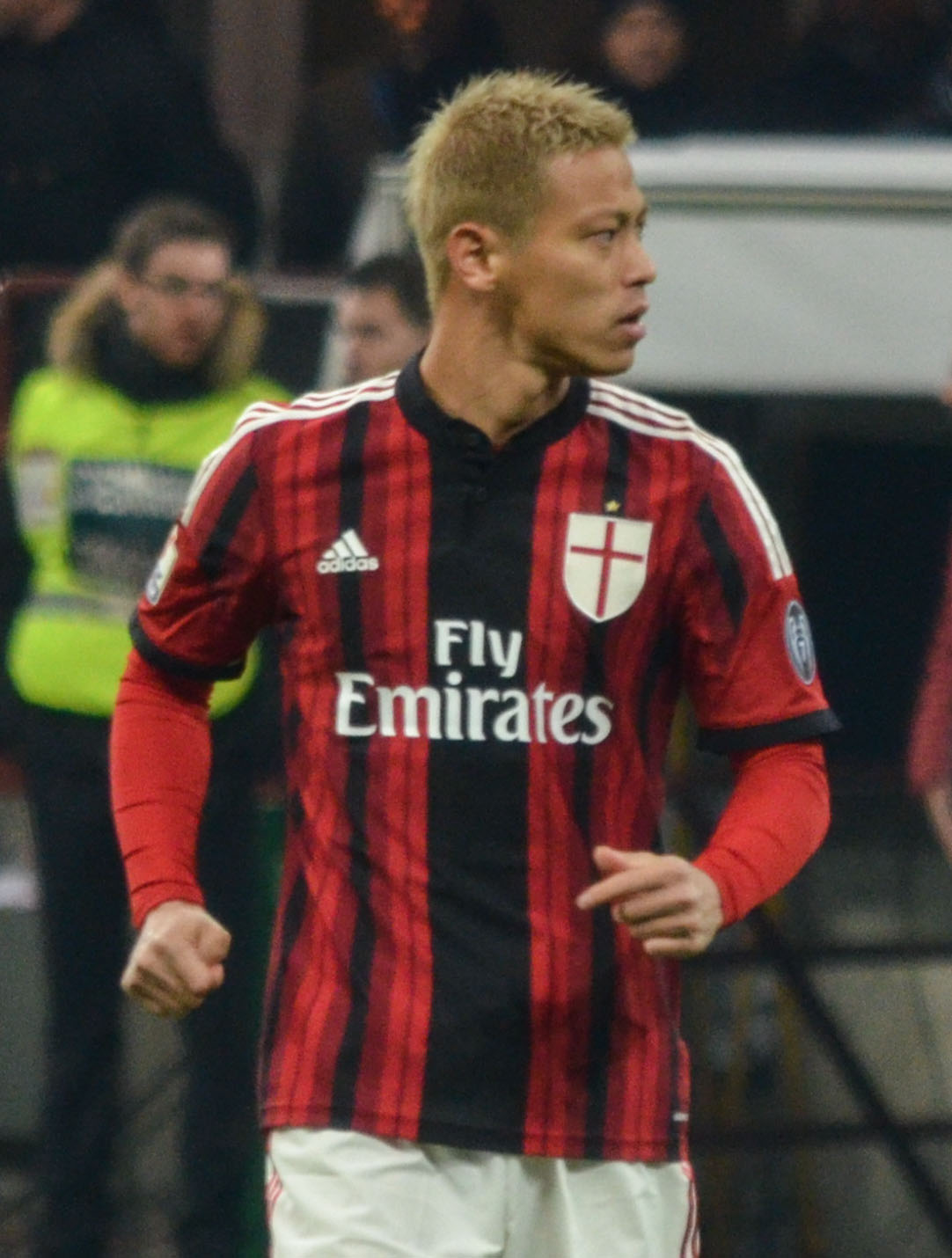
Honda playing for AC Milan in 2015

==== 2013–14 season ====
On 27 October 2013, AC Milan manager Massimiliano Allegri announced a deal for Honda to join Milan on a free transfer in January 2014. Honda officially joined the team on 4 January 2014 on a contract lasting until June 2017 and wore the number 10 jersey.

On 12 January 2014, Honda made his debut coming on as a substitute for Robinho in a 4–3 Serie A defeat to Sassuolo. On 15 January, Honda made his full debut for Milan, scoring in the 3–1 Coppa Italia quarter-final win against Spezia. On 26 January, Honda assisted Giampaolo Pazzini in the 89th minute to secure a 2–1 win over Cagliari. On 7 April, he scored his first Serie A goal in against Genoa in a 1–2 away win. Honda's contribution for Milan in the latter half of the 2013–14 season was considered disappointing, and he himself stated that "this is not me".

==== 2014–15 season ====
On 31 August 2014, Honda scored for Milan against Lazio, netting the club's first goal of the season as the Rossoneri won 3–1 in Filippo Inzaghi's Serie A debut as manager. Honda went on to score Milan's second goal against Parma on 14 September, helping Milan to win a nine-goal thriller, 5–4. Honda provided an assist for Giacomo Bonaventura's opening goal and scored a bullet header to restore Milan's lead, from Ignazio Abate's cross. In Milan's next match against Empoli on 23 September, Honda drilled in a shot on the edge of the box equalizing for Milan as the sides drew 2–2. Honda scored with a precise free kick over the Chievo wall in a 2–0 win on 4 October. Honda scored his first brace playing for Milan in a 3–1 away win against Verona on 19 October. He assisted twice which saw Milan winning 2–1 against AS Roma on 9 May 2015.

==== 2015–16 season ====
During the 2015–16 Coppa Italia third round fixture against Perugia on 17 August 2015, Honda scored and assisted Luiz Adriano in a 2–0 win. He also assisted Carlos Bacca in the round of 16 tie against Sampdoria which secured a 2–0 win on 17 December. Honda went on to have a good record in the Coppa Italia guiding his team all the way to the final.

==== 2016–17 season ====
On 21 May 2017, Honda scored from a free kick against Bologna winning the game and thus qualifying Milan to the UEFA Europa League for the first time since the 2013–14 season.

=== Pachuca ===
On 14 July 2017, Mexican club Pachuca announced the signing of Honda. On 23 August 2017, Honda scored on his debut in a 4–1 win over Veracruz. On 26 October, he scored a brace in a 5–0 thrashing win over Zacatepec in the 2017 Copa MX round of 16 tie. Honda played in the 2017 Copa MX final against Monterrey on 22 December. Honda played in the 2017 FIFA Club World Cup helping his team to finish in third place.

On 21 January 2018, Honda assisted twice in a 3–1 win over Lobos BUAP. On 12 February, he assisted Érick Gutiérrez to score the only goal to secure a win against Veracruz. Honda than rescued Pachuca by scoring a penalty in the stoppage time against León in a 2–1 win on 25 February. Honda later scored a brace in a 6–2 thrashing win over Puebla on 7 April. In the next match against Santos Laguna on 15 April, he scored and assist in a 3–1 win. He ended the season with 13 goals and 8 assists in 36 appearances across all competition for the club.

=== Melbourne Victory ===
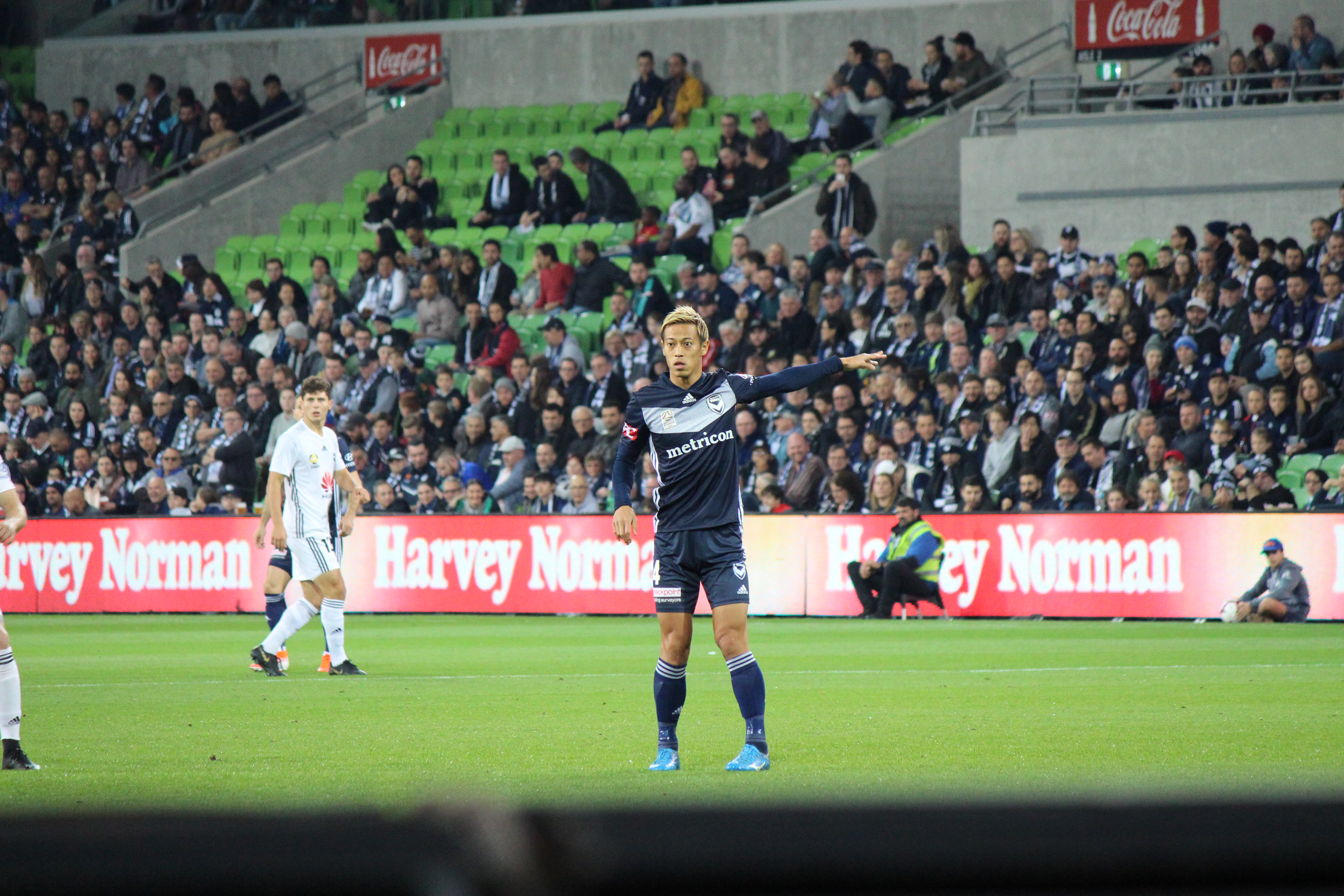
Honda playing for Melbourne Victory in 2019

On 6 August 2018, Honda signed for Australian A-League side Melbourne Victory. He scored on his A-League debut, in Victory's opening game of the 2018–19 A-League, a 2–1 loss to Melbourne City in the Melbourne Derby. On 25 November, he scored the winning goal in a 2–1 win over Sydney FC. Honda later rescued his club scoring an equaliser in a 1–1 draw to Wellington Phoenix on 15 February 2019. He make his AFC Champions League debut on 5 March in a 1–3 lost to Korean club Daegu FC. In the next match, he captained his club against Japanese club Sanfrecce Hiroshima where he scored in a 2–1 lost on 12 March.On 3 May 2019, Honda announced that he would leave the club at the end of the 2018–19 A-League season, also stating that he would not sign with an A-League team following his departure which saw him scoring 8 goals and 7 assists in 24 appearances for the club across all competition.

=== Vitesse ===
In the succeeding September, Honda publicly offered, on Twitter, to play for Manchester United and AC Milan. On 6 November 2019, he signed a contract for one season at Eredivisie club Vitesse Arnhem. However, after Leonid Slutsky's departure, Honda decided to also leave Vitesse after only four league appearances.

=== Botafogo ===
On 31 January 2020, Honda signed with Campeonato Brasileiro Série A side Botafogo where he was named as the club captain. On 15 March, he made his debut and scored his first goal, opening the score from a penalty kick in a 1–1 draw against Bangu in the Campeonato Carioca. Honda goal recognised him for being the first player to score on five different continents in which he scored in. On 11 October, he scored a goal in a 2–1 win over Sport Recife in the Campeonato Brasileiro Série A. However, Honda left the club on 28 December, three months shy of the end of his contract, stating his frustration with the lack of results and the decisions by the club's board, which had changed head coaches four times during the season, while also thanking and apologising to the fans. He made 27 appearances across all competitions and scored three goals.

=== Portimonense ===
On 4 February 2021, Honda announced that he had reached an agreement with Primeira Liga club Portimonense. The signing was officially confirmed two days later, with Honda joining the Portuguese side on a six-month deal with the option for a one-year extension. The deal, however, broke down after Portmonense was unable to register him in the league, as a LPFP ruling required free agent players to be at least three months in that status in order to be registered outside of the transfer window period; Honda had spent less than two months out of contract. He parted ways with the club amicably on 11 February.

=== Neftçi ===
On 15 March 2021, Honda joined Azerbaijan Premier League club Neftçi PFK on a deal until the end of the season. He scored his first goal for the club on 3 May in a 3–0 win over Keshla. Honda then scored in the next match on 8 May in a 4–0 win over Sabail. At the end of the season, Honda won 2020–21 Azerbaijan Premier League title with Neftçi. On 16 June 2021, Neftçi confirmed that Honda had left the club after the expiration of his contract, during which he scored twice in seven games for the club.

=== Sūduva ===
On 14 September 2021, Honda joined Lithuanian A Lyga club Sūduva for the remaining 2021 season until 31 December 2021. He scored on his official debut for the club on 26 September in a 4–0 win over Banga Gargždai.

=== Paro ===
Following a two-and-a-half-year break and taking on managerial duties, Bhutan Premier League side Paro announced Honda's return to professional football on 29 July 2024. He initially joined Paro on a one-match contract to play in the AFC Challenge League qualfying play-off against Church Boys United but ended up playing in the Bhutan Premier League against Tsirang in a 2–1 win on 8 August. He later captain the side in the AFC Challenge League qualfying play-off helping his team to a 2–1 win victory which saw his team qualified to the group stage campaign.

=== FC Jurong ===
On 10 April 2026, Singapore Premier League club FC Jurong announced that Honda will be joining the club for the upcoming 2026–27 season.

== International career ==
=== Youth career and early senior career ===
Honda was a member of the Japan team for 2005 FIFA World Youth Championship and played for the U-23 national team, that qualified for 2008 Summer Olympics finals. He made a full international debut for Japan on 22 June 2008 in a World Cup qualifier against Bahrain. On 14 July 2008, he was formally named as one of the midfielders of the Japanese U-23 national football team for the Beijing Olympics football competition. He scored his first goal for the senior national team on 27 May 2009 in a friendly match against Chile at Nagai Stadium in Osaka and has since been given the nickname "Emperor Keisuke". He has scored 37 goals in 98 games for the Japan national team from his debut in 2008, onwards.

=== 2010 FIFA World Cup ===
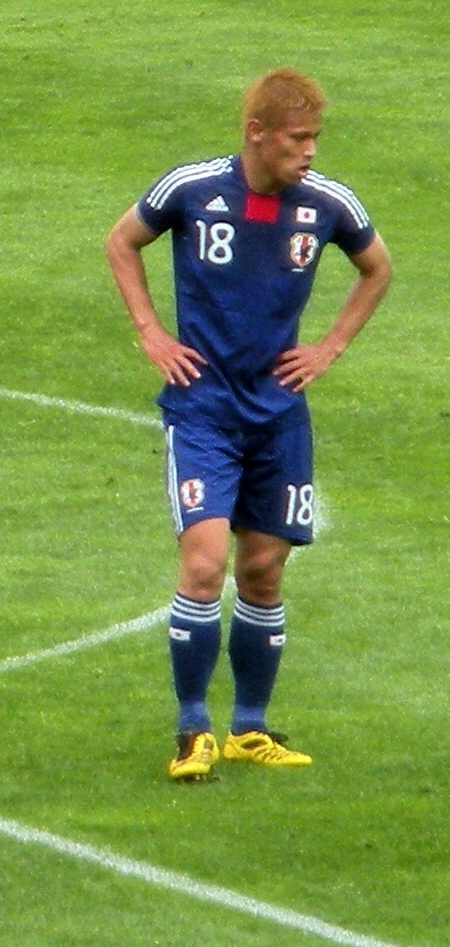
Honda playing for Japan at the 2010 FIFA World Cup

Honda rose to prominence in the 2010 FIFA World Cup and became the country's newest prospect. He scored the only goal in Japan's opening match against Cameroon, finishing off Daisuke Matsui's cross into the top left corner of the net. His performance in the game gained him the Man of the Match Award from FIFA and the 1–0 victory was Japan's first World Cup triumph on foreign soil. In the final group-stage game against Denmark, he scored a magnificent free kick in the 17th minute from 30 yards out. He then turned provider for Shinji Okazaki after making his way into the penalty area, with a Cruyff Turn that beat a Denmark player, in the 88th minute to make the score 3–1 to Japan, a performance that earned him the "Man of the Match" award once more and qualified Japan for the knockout stage. In their round of 16 matchup, Japan were eliminated by Paraguay, falling 3–5 in penalty kicks after the game finished goalless through extra time.

Jonathan Wilson of The Guardian cited him as a 'false nine': a player superficially employed as a centre forward but moving deeper to pull the opposition defence around the pitch.

=== 2011 AFC Asian Cup ===
Honda was included in the 2011 AFC Asian Cup by coach Alberto Zaccheroni. In the game against Syria, he scored a penalty kick making the score 2–1 for Japan. In the semi-finals against South Korea, he took a penalty kick, but was blocked by Jung Sung-Ryong. However, in the penalty shoot out of the game, he scored and was named "Man of the Match".

Honda was awarded the most valuable player of the 2011 AFC Asian Cup as Japan lifted a record fourth continental title.

=== 2014 FIFA World Cup qualification ===
Honda missed the majority of the third round of 2014 FIFA World Cup qualification due to injury he picked up while playing for his club, AC Milan.

During the fourth round of qualifying, on 3 June 2012, in Japan's first game in Group B against Oman, Honda scored a beautiful volley just eleven minutes into the game. The game ended in 3–0 a win for Japan. He continued his scoring streak against Jordan on 8 June 2012, managing to net a hat-trick; Japan went on to win 6–0. He also played a crucial role during their 1–1 draw with Australia on 12 June 2012, during a corner kick, he assisted a goal which was scored by Yuzo Kurihara.

Honda missed a couple of friendly games and one qualification game due to injury from club duty and was subsequently not included in the squad that was shocked 2–1 by Jordan on 26 March 2013. Although not 100 percent fit, Honda was named in the squad for the game against Australia on 4 June 2013, having just won the Russian Cup with his club. All Japan needed from this match was a draw to secure their place for Brazil. He managed to score a goal via penalty kick during extra time from a handball from Matt McKay, making the score 1–1. The result secured Japan's qualification for the 2014 FIFA World Cup in Brazil and became the first nation to book their place at the tournament.

Having won the 2011 AFC Asian Cup, Japan qualified for the 2013 FIFA Confederations Cup in Brazil in 2013 and Honda was once again included in Zaccheroni's squad for the tournament. After losing 3–0 to hosts Brazil in the first group match on 15 June 2013, Japan faced Italy in the next game; Honda scored from the penalty spot to put Japan ahead but they fell 4–3 in a pulsating game which dumped the Asian champions out of the competition.

=== 2014 FIFA World Cup ===
Japan was drawn into Group C in the 2014 FIFA World Cup in Brazil having to face Colombia, Greece, and Ivory Coast. In Japan's opening game against Ivory Coast, Honda collected a pass from Yuto Nagatomo after a quick throw-in and scored with a left footed shot in the 16th minute of the game. With this goal Honda became the first Japanese player to score in two World Cups, and also claimed sole possession of being the top Japanese scorer in FIFA World Cup history with three total goals. Japan went on to lose 2–1 to the African team.

=== 2015 AFC Asian Cup ===
Honda was included in Javier Aguirre's 23-man squad for 2015 AFC Asian Cup. Honda started Japan's opener match against Palestine and scored a penalty kick in their 4–0 win. In next match against Iraq, Honda again netted a penalty which Japan won the match 1–0 and the first goal in 2–0 win of Jordan.

Honda participated in Japan's quarter final match against the United Arab Emirates. After the match ended 1–1 after extra time Honda, who was Japan's first kicker in the penalty shootout, missed his kick, shooting above the crossbar, as Japan ended up losing the shootout 5–4.

=== 2018 FIFA World Cup ===
On 24 June 2018, Honda scored a goal against Senegal in the second match of the group stages of Group H. With this goal, he became the top scoring Asian player in FIFA World Cup history and the only player to register a goal and an assist in each of the last three tournaments. After Japan's exit in the Round of 16, Honda announced his plan to retire from the international stage.

== Managerial career ==
=== Cambodia ===
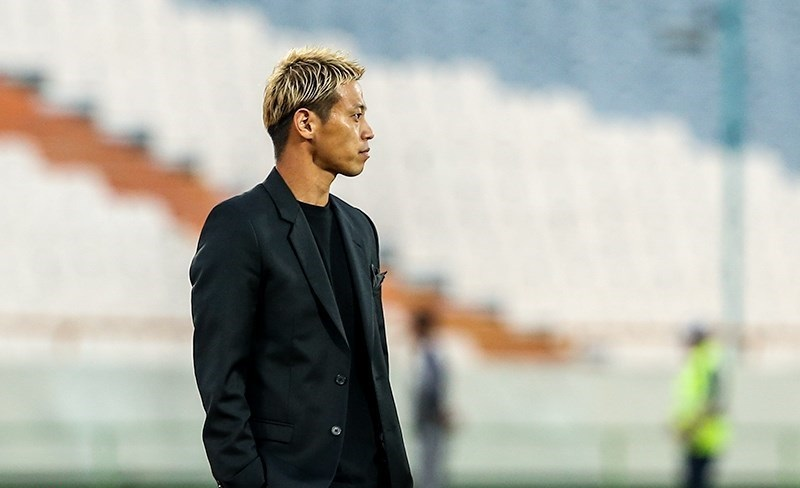
Honda managing Cambodia against Iran in 2019

In August 2018, whilst still a player, Honda was named general manager of the Cambodia national team in a voluntary unpaid role. Under this arrangement, Honda held weekly conferences with the Cambodia coaching staff, and was on the touchline when Cambodia's matches were during international breaks, with his assistant, Félix Dalmás stepping in whenever Honda was unavailable. On 10 September 2018, Honda lost his opening game as manager of Cambodia 3–1 against Malaysia.

Cambodia finished last in its 2022 FIFA world cup qualifying group and suffered two extraordinary defeats to Iran, first 14–0 in late 2019 and then 10–0 in June 2021.

In January 2023, the Football Federation of Cambodia announced that the 2022 AFF Championship would be Honda's last tournament with the national team. Despite failing to advance past the group stage, Honda helped the team to their best achievement in the tournament with 2 wins, one of which was against the Philippines. Honda would fulfill his final duties as general manager for the under-23 team during the 2023 SEA Games, which Cambodia hosted. However, Honda did not manage to guide his team out of the group stage, finishing third in their group behind Indonesia and Myanmar.

== Personal life ==
Coming from a sporting family, Keisuke Honda's older brother was also a footballer. Honda's great-uncle Daisaburo was a canoeist who represented Japan in C-2 1000 metres event at the 1964 Tokyo Olympics. Keisuke Honda's cousin is Tamon Honda, a professional wrestler and former Olympic wrestler, who participated in three Olympic Games in freestyle wrestling in 100 kg at the 1984, 1988 Games, and in 130 kg at the 1992 showpiece, and is also a former tag team champion, winning the All Asia Tag Team Championship and GHC Tag Team Championship.

He married Misako, whom he knew since high school. Honda has three children.

Honda is co-founder and general partner of investment firm X&KSK, which raised $98 million in January 2025 to invest in AI and tech startups.

=== Political views ===
Honda has sporadically drawn the public attention for his controversial remarks on political issues.

- In August 2025, he denied the Nanjing Massacre by citing Shintaro Ishihara's opinions on a social media, and immediately withdrew and apologized. However, despite his initial declaration to agree with the primary sources, he afterward expressed a sentiment not to conclude the issue strictly.
- Regarding the 2026 United States strikes in Venezuela, Honda evaluated the operation under the Trump administration as a "reinitiation of the world police" and a "role model for power play to carry forward with international negotiations advantageously ", describing the incident controversial yet unstoppable.

== Career statistics ==
=== Club ===
As of match played 18 September 2026

Appearances and goals by club, season and competition
Club	Season	League			National cup (Note: Includes Emperor's Cup, KNVB Cup, Russian Cup, Coppa Italia, Copa MX, Copa do Brasil)		League cup (Note: Includes J.League Cup)		Continental		Other		Total	
Club	Season	Division	Apps	Goals	Apps	Goals	Apps	Goals	Apps	Goals	Apps	Goals	Apps	Goals
Nagoya Grampus	2004	J1 League	0	0	0	0	1	0	—		—		1	0
Nagoya Grampus	2005	J1 League	31	2	2	0	2	0	—		—		35	2
Nagoya Grampus	2006	J1 League	29	6	1	0	4	2	—		—		34	8
Nagoya Grampus	2007	J1 League	30	3	2	0	3	0	—		—		35	3
Nagoya Grampus	Total		90	11	5	0	10	2	—		—		105	13
VVV-Venlo	2007–08	Eredivisie	14	2	—		—		—		3 (Note: Appearances in Eredivisie/Eerste Divisie relegation play-offs)	0	17	2
VVV-Venlo	2008–09	Eerste Divisie	36	16	1	0	—		—		—		37	16
VVV-Venlo	2009–10	Eredivisie	18	6	2	2	—		—		—		20	8
VVV-Venlo	Total		68	24	3	2	—		—		3	0	74	26
CSKA Moscow	2010	Russian Premier League	28	4	5	0	—		10 (Note: Four appearances and one goal in UEFA Champions League, six appearances and one goal in UEFA Europa League)	2	1 (Note: Appearance in Russian Super Cup)	0	44	6
CSKA Moscow	2011–12	Russian Premier League	25	8	1	0	—		1 (Note: Appearance(s) in UEFA Champions League)	0	1	0	28	8
CSKA Moscow	2012–13	Russian Premier League	23	7	3	1	—		2 (Note: Appearances in UEFA Europa League)	1	—		28	9
CSKA Moscow	2013–14	Russian Premier League	18	1	0	0	—		6	2	1	2	25	5
CSKA Moscow	Total		94	20	9	1	—		19	5	3	2	127	28
AC Milan	2013–14	Serie A	14	1	2	1	—		—		—		16	2
AC Milan	2014–15	Serie A	29	6	1	0	—		—		—		30	6
AC Milan	2015–16	Serie A	30	1	7	1	—		—		—		37	2
AC Milan	2016–17	Serie A	8	1	1	0	—		—		—		9	1
AC Milan	Total		81	9	11	2	—		—		—		92	11
Pachuca	2017–18	Liga MX	29	10	5	3	—		—		2 (Note: Appearances in FIFA Club World Cup)	0	36	13
Melbourne Victory	2018–19	A-League	18	7	0	0	—		4 (Note: Appearances in AFC Champions League)	1	—		22	8
Vitesse	2019–20	Eredivisie	4	0	0	0	—		—		—		4	0
Botafogo	2020	Série A	18	2	5	0	—		—		4 (Note: Appearances in Campeonato Carioca)	1	27	3
Neftçi	2020–21	Azerbaijan Premier League	7	2	0	0	—		—		—		7	2
Sūduva	2021	A Lyga	6	1	0	0	—		—		—		6	1
Paro	2024	Bhutan Premier League	1	0	0	0	—		1 (Note: Appearance in AFC Challenge League)	0	—		2	0
Jurong	2026–27	Singapore Premier League	1	0	0	0	—		–		—		1	0
Career total			417	86	38	8	10	2	24	6	12	3	499	106

=== International ===
Appearances and goals by national team and year
National team	Year	Apps	Goals
Japan	2008	1	0
Japan	2009	10	3
Japan	2010	12	3
Japan	2011	8	2
Japan	2012	9	4
Japan	2013	12	8
Japan	2014	13	4
Japan	2015	14	10
Japan	2016	7	2
Japan	2017	5	0
Japan	2018	7	1
Total		98	37

Scores and results list Japan's goal tally first, score column indicates score after each Honda goal.

List of international goals scored by Keisuke Honda
No.	Date	Venue	Opponent	Score	Result	Competition
1	27 May 2009	Nagai Stadium, Osaka, Japan	Chile	4–0	4–0	Friendly
2	10 October 2009	Nissan Stadium, Yokohama, Japan	Scotland	2–0	2–0	Friendly
3	14 October 2009	Miyagi Stadium, Rifu, Japan	Togo	5–0	5–0	Friendly
4	3 March 2010	Toyota Stadium, Toyota, Japan	Bahrain	2–0	2–0	2011 AFC Asian Cup qualification
5	14 June 2010	Free State Stadium, Bloemfontein, South Africa	Cameroon	1–0	1–0	2010 FIFA World Cup
6	24 June 2010	Royal Bafokeng Stadium, Rustenburg, South Africa	Denmark	1–0	3–1	2010 FIFA World Cup
7	13 January 2011	Qatar SC Stadium, Doha, Qatar	Syria	2–1	2–1	2011 AFC Asian Cup
8	10 August 2011	Sapporo Dome, Sapporo, Japan	South Korea	2–0	3–0	Friendly
9	3 June 2012	Saitama Stadium 2002, Saitama, Japan	Oman	1–0	3–0	2014 FIFA World Cup qualification
10	8 June 2012	Saitama Stadium 2002, Saitama, Japan	Jordan	2–0	6–0	2014 FIFA World Cup qualification
11	8 June 2012	Saitama Stadium 2002, Saitama, Japan	Jordan	3–0	6–0	2014 FIFA World Cup qualification
12	8 June 2012	Saitama Stadium 2002, Saitama, Japan	Jordan	5–0	6–0	2014 FIFA World Cup qualification
13	6 February 2013	Home's Stadium Kobe, Kobe, Japan	Latvia	2–0	3–0	Friendly
14	4 June 2013	Saitama Stadium 2002, Saitama, Japan	Australia	1–1	1–1	2014 FIFA World Cup qualification
15	19 June 2013	Arena Pernambuco, Recife, Brazil	Italy	1–0	3–4	2013 FIFA Confederations Cup
16	14 August 2013	Miyagi Stadium, Rifu, Japan	Uruguay	2–4	2–4	Friendly
17	6 September 2013	Nagai Stadium, Osaka, Japan	Guatemala	1–0	3–0	Friendly
18	10 September 2013	International Stadium Yokohama, Kanagawa, Japan	Ghana	3–1	3–1	Friendly
19	16 November 2013	Cristal Arena, Genk, Belgium	Netherlands	2–2	2–2	Friendly
20	19 November 2013	King Baudouin Stadium, Brussels, Belgium	Belgium	2–1	3–2	Friendly
21	7 June 2014	Raymond James Stadium, Tampa, United States	Zambia	1–2	4–3	Friendly
22	7 June 2014	Raymond James Stadium, Tampa, United States	Zambia	3–2	4–3	Friendly
23	14 June 2014	Arena Pernambuco, Recife, Brazil	Ivory Coast	1–0	1–2	2014 FIFA World Cup
24	14 November 2014	Toyota Stadium, Toyota, Japan	Honduras	2–0	6–0	Friendly
25	12 January 2015	Newcastle Stadium, Newcastle, Australia	Palestine	3–0	4–0	2015 AFC Asian Cup
26	16 January 2015	Suncorp Stadium, Brisbane, Australia	Iraq	1–0	1–0	2015 AFC Asian Cup
27	20 January 2015	Melbourne Rectangular Stadium, Melbourne, Australia	Jordan	1–0	2–0	2015 AFC Asian Cup
28	27 March 2015	Ōita Bank Dome, Ōita, Japan	Tunisia	2–0	2–0	Friendly
29	11 June 2015	Nissan Stadium, Yokohama, Japan	Iraq	1–0	4–0	Friendly
30	3 September 2015	Saitama Stadium 2002, Saitama, Japan	Cambodia	1–0	3–0	2018 FIFA World Cup qualification
31	8 September 2015	Azadi Stadium, Tehran, Iran	Afghanistan	6–0	6–0	2018 FIFA World Cup qualification
32	8 October 2015	Seeb Stadium, Seeb, Oman	Syria	1–0	3–0	2018 FIFA World Cup qualification
33	12 November 2015	National Stadium, Singapore	Singapore	2–0	3–0	2018 FIFA World Cup qualification
34	17 November 2015	Olympic Stadium, Phnom Penh, Cambodia	Cambodia	2–0	2–0	2018 FIFA World Cup qualification
35	29 March 2016	Saitama Stadium 2002, Saitama, Japan	Syria	3–0	5–0	2018 FIFA World Cup qualification
36	1 September 2016	Saitama Stadium 2002, Saitama, Japan	United Arab Emirates	1–0	1–2	2018 FIFA World Cup qualification
37	24 June 2018	Central Stadium, Yekaterinburg, Russia	Senegal	2–2	2–2	2018 FIFA World Cup

=== Managerial ===
As of match played 10 May 2023

Managerial record by team and tenure
Team	From	To	Record					Ref.
Team	From	To	P	W	D	L	Win %	Ref.
Cambodia	12 August 2018	4 January 2023	34	9	4	21	26.5	
Cambodia U23	17 March 2022	10 May 2023	11	3	2	6	27.3	
Total			45	12	6	27	26.7	—

== Honours ==
=== Club ===
VVV-Venlo

- Eerste Divisie: 2008–09

CSKA Moscow

- Russian Premier League: 2012–13
- Russian Cup: 2010–11, 2012–13
- Russian Super Cup: 2013

AC Milan

- Supercoppa Italiana: 2016

Neftçi

- Azerbaijan Premier League: 2020–21

Paro

- Bhutan Premier League: 2024

=== International ===
Japan

- AFC Asian Cup: 2011

=== Individual ===
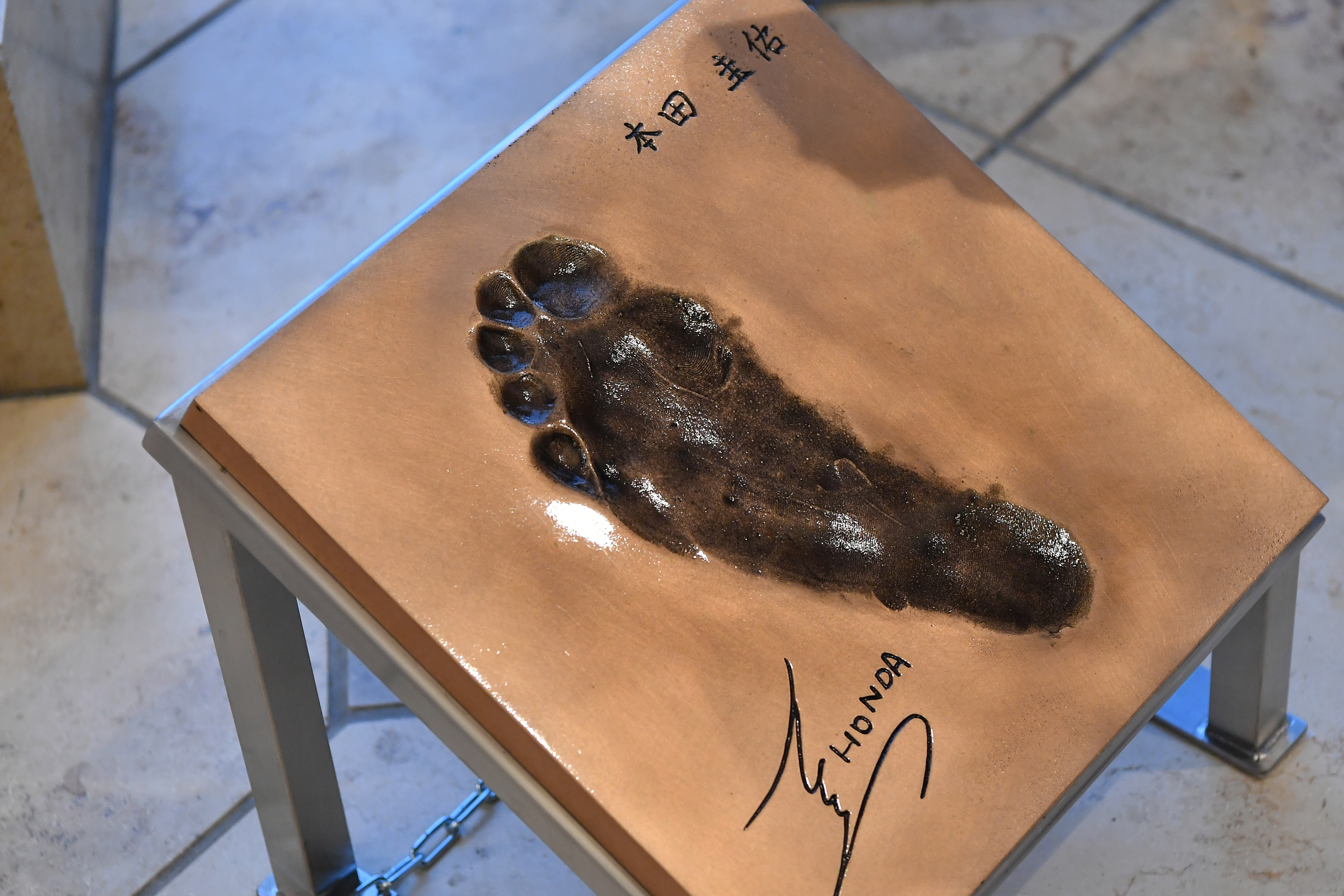
Honda's footprint on display at the main lobby of J-Village

- Eerste Divisie Player of the Year: 2008–09
- Japanese Footballer of the Year: 2010
- AFC Asian Cup Most Valuable Player: 2011
- AFC Asian Cup Quality Player: 2011
- Best Footballer in Asia: 2013
- AFC Asian Cup Fans' All-time XI: 2018
- IFFHS Men's Team of the Decade (AFC): 2011–2020
- AFC Opta All-time XI at the FIFA World Cup: 2020
- AFC Fans' All-time XI at the FIFA World Cup: 2020
- AFC Asian Cup All-time XI: 2023
