= 2022 BFF President's Cup =

Tournament details
- Country: Bhutan
- Dates: 5 January – 15 January 2022
- Teams: 7

Final positions
- Champions: Transport United (1st title)
- Runners-up: Thimphu City

The 2022 BFF President's Cup was the first edition of the Bhutan Football Federation's President's Cup, hosted in Gyalpozhing, Mongar. Teams competed in a knockout format. The first match was played on January 5.

Transport United won the tournament by defeating Thimphu City in the final on penalties.

== Group A ==
- Paro
- Ugyen Academy
- Druk Lhayul
- Youngster

Pos	Team	Pld	W	D	L	GF	GA	GD	Pts
1	Druk Lhayul	3	2	1	0	5	3	+2	7
2	Paro	3	2	0	1	10	4	+6	6
3	Ugyen Academy	3	1	1	1	3	3	0	4
4	Youngster	3	0	0	3	2	10	−8	0

== Group B ==
- Transport United
- Thimphu City
- Tensung (withdrew)
- Sherubtse

Pos	Team	Pld	W	D	L	GF	GA	GD	Pts
1	Thimphu City	2	2	0	0	9	1	+8	6
2	Transport United	2	1	0	1	6	4	+2	3
3	Sherubtse	2	0	0	2	1	11	−10	0
4	Tensung	0	0	0	0	0	0	0	0

== Knockout stage ==
- Druk Lhayul
- Paro
- Thimphu City
- Transport United

Semi-finals
Druk Lhayul	0
Transport United	3
Thimphu City	2
Paro	1

Final
Transport United (p)	1 (4)
Thimphu City	1 (2)

== See also ==
- Football in Bhutan
- Bhutan Premier League
- Bhutan national football team
- Jigme Dorji Wangchuk Memorial Gold Cup
