= 2020 Bhutan Premier League =

Bhutan Premier League
- Season: 2020
- Champions: Thimphu City
- Relegated: none
- AFC Cup: Thimphu City
- Top goalscorer: Tshering Dorji

The 2020 Bhutan Premier League was the ninth season of the unified league, rebranded as the Bhutan Premier League since 2019 (previously the Bhutan National League), the top national football competition in Bhutan, having replaced the A-Division in 2013.

The Bhutan Football Federation implemented the same league structure as in the 2019 season. The top division was named Bhutan Premier League (BPL). The other division was named Bhutan Super League (BSL), replacing Thimphu League as a qualifying competition for the Premier League. The lowest division was named Dzongkhag League where teams played in their respective districts (Dzongkhags) to gain promotion to the Super League.

== Super League ==
Bhutan Super League
- Season: 2020
- Champions: High Quality United

The 2020 Bhutan Super League featured eight teams, one fewer than last season. One more team from Dzongkhag League was promoted instead of dissolved Phuentsholing United.

=== Teams ===
==== Teams returning from 2019 Bhutan Super League ====
- Druk Stars
- High Quality United
- Paro United
- BFF Academy U-17

==== Teams promoted from 2019 Dzongkhag League ====
- CST
- Paro Rinpung
- Punakha Gomo
- Tensung

=== Regular season ===
The regular season was played in single round-robin format. It started on 6 February, which was delayed from the scheduled start of 1 February, and ended on 11 March.

Pos	Team	Pld	W	D	L	GF	GA	GD	Pts	Qualification or relegation
1	High Quality United	7	6	0	1	34	10	+24	18	Qualification for Playoffs and 2020 Bhutan Premier League
2	Tensung	7	4	1	2	15	9	+6	13	Qualification for Playoffs and 2020 Bhutan Premier League
3	Paro United	7	4	1	2	18	14	+4	13	Qualification for Playoffs and 2020 Bhutan Premier League
4	Druk Stars	7	3	3	1	17	12	+5	12	Qualification for Playoffs and 2020 Bhutan Premier League
5	BFF Academy U-17	7	3	1	3	15	14	+1	10	Qualification for 2020 Bhutan Premier League (withdrew)
6	Paro Rinpung	7	3	0	4	10	13	−3	9	Relegated to Dzongkhag League
7	Punakha Gomo	7	2	0	5	15	21	−6	6	Relegated to Dzongkhag League
8	CST	7	0	0	7	4	35	−31	0	Relegated to Dzongkhag League

Source: BFF

=== Playoffs ===
The playoffs were played from 14 to 21 March.

==== First semi-final ====
14 March 2020
18:00

High Quality United	3–1	Tensung

Changlimithang Stadium

==== Second semi-final ====
15 March 2020
18:00

Paro United	1–0	Druk Stars

Changlimithang Stadium

==== Third semi-final ====
17 March 2020
18:00

Tensung	1–1	Paro United
Penalties
	2–4

Changlimithang Stadium

==== Final ====
21 March 2020
18:00

High Quality United	2–1	Paro United

Changlimithang Stadium

== Premier League ==
The 2020 Bhutan Premier League featured eight teams, two fewer than last season. The league started on 1 August 2020, after a delay due to the COVID-19 pandemic in Bhutan, and most matches were played behind closed doors. On 11 August 2020, the league was suspended until further notice due to the nationwide lockdown. It has resumed again from 17 September 2020.

=== Teams ===
Top four teams of 2019 Bhutan Premier League

- Paro
- Transport United
- Thimphu City
- Ugyen Academy

Top four teams of 2020 Bhutan Super League

- High Quality United
- Tensung
- Paro United
- Druk Stars

BFF Academy U-19 (fifth in 2019 Bhutan Premier League), Druk United (sixth in 2019 Bhutan Premier League), and BFF Academy U-17 (fifth in 2020 Bhutan Super League) all withdrew.

=== League table ===
Pos	Team	Pld	W	D	L	GF	GA	GD	Pts	Qualification or relegation
1	Thimphu City (C)	14	12	1	1	44	17	+27	37	Qualification for AFC Cup preliminary round 1 and 2021 Bhutan Super League
2	Ugyen Academy	14	11	1	2	28	15	+13	34	2021 Bhutan Premier League
3	Paro	14	9	0	5	47	20	+27	27	2021 Bhutan Premier League
4	Transport United	14	6	3	5	23	19	+4	21	2021 Bhutan Premier League
5	Paro United	14	4	2	8	23	29	−6	14	2021 Bhutan Premier League
6	High Quality United	14	4	1	9	28	32	−4	13	2021 Bhutan Premier League
7	Tensung	14	3	4	7	18	32	−14	13	2021 Bhutan Premier League
8	Druk Stars	14	1	0	13	5	52	−47	3	2021 Bhutan Premier League

Source: BPL
(C) Champions
