= Shapa Gewog =

Shapa Gewog ཤར་པ་
- Gewogs
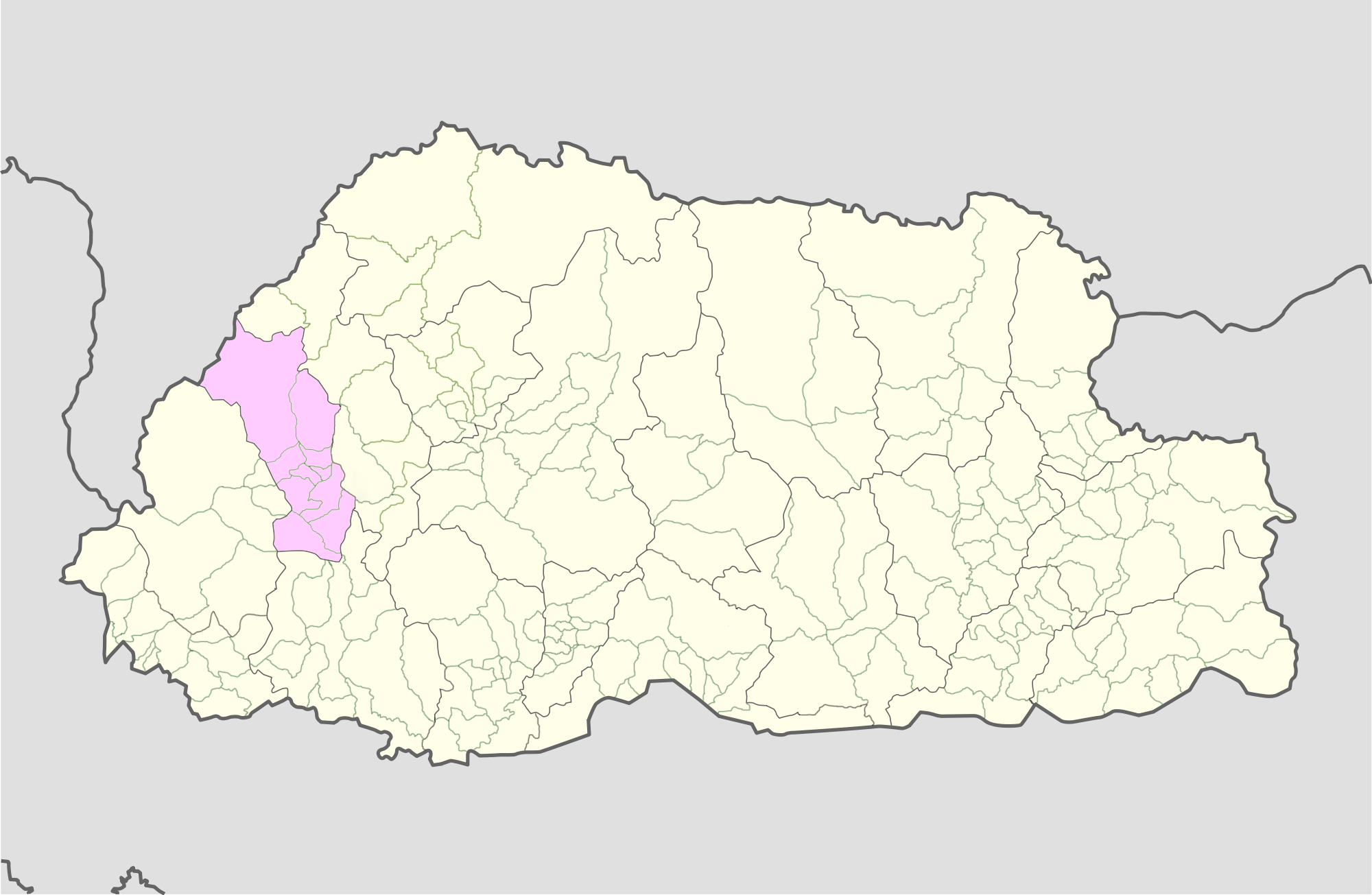
- Country: Bhutan
- District: Paro District
- Time zone: UTC+6 (BTT)

Shapa Gewog (Dzongkha: ཤར་པ་) is a gewog (village block) of Paro District, Bhutan. In 2002, the gewog had an area of 76.4 square kilometres and contained 8 chewogs and 253 households.
