= 2024 Bhutan Premier League =

Bhutan Premier League
- Season: 2024
- Dates: 11 May – 20 October
- Champions: Paro
- 2025–26 AFC Challenge League: Paro
- Matches: 86
- Goals: 367 (4.27 per match)
- Top goalscorer: (Ghana) Richard Gadze (27 goals)
- Biggest home win: Thimphu City 7–0 Tsirang
- Biggest away win: Daga United 1–11 Paro
- Highest scoring: Daga United 1–11 Paro

The 2024 Bhutan Premier League was the 13th season of the Bhutan Premier League, the top national football competition in Bhutan.

It began with the qualifying phase to decide the final five teams to participate in the main league phase. The main league phase began on 11 May 2024 and the season concluded on 20 October 2024.

Three-time defending champions Paro successfully retained their title and won the league for a fourth consecutive season, the fifth time overall.

== Background ==
Paro, the most successful team in the history of the Bhutan Premier League, came into the season as three-time defending champions having won the league in 2021, 2022 and 2023. In total, they had won the league four times.

The Bhutan Premier League had been founded as the Bhutan National League in 2012 and was rebranded in 2019.

== Format ==
A qualifying stage consisting of a single round robin group of eight teams was held to determine the four teams which would participate alongside the highest-ranked teams from the previous season and BFF Academy U-19. The main league phase consisted of a double round robin between the 10 participating teams.

== Qualifying ==
Ordinarily, the top six finishers in the previous season would automatically qualify for the following season. However, Druk Lhayul – who finished fourth – were dissolved after the 2023 season. As a result, only five teams – Paro, Thimphu City, Transport United, Royal Thimphu College and Tensung were automatically qualified. They were joined by BFF Academy U-19.

The top four finishers in the qualifying stage were Daga United, Samtse, Tsirang and Phuntsholing Heroes.

== Teams ==
Team	Stadium	Location	Capacity
BFF Academy U-19	Changlimithang Stadium	Thimphu	15,000
Daga United	Dagapela Football Stadium	Dagapela	1,000
Paro	Woochu Sports Arena	Paro	1,000
Phuntsholing Heroes	PSA Stadium	Phuntsholing	2,000
Royal Thimphu College	RTC Ground; Changlimithang Stadium	Thimphu	1,000; 15,000
Samtse	Samtse Dzongkhag Ground	Samtse	2,000
Tensung	MTC Ground	Wangdue Phodrang	1,000
Thimphu City	Changlimithang Stadium	Thimphu	15,000
Transport United	Changlimithang Stadium	Thimphu	15,000
Tsirang	Tsirang Artificial Turf	Damphu	1,000

== League table ==
Pos	Team	Pld	W	D	L	GF	GA	GD	Pts	Qualification or relegation
1	Paro (C)	18	15	2	1	81	17	+64	47	Qualification for AFC Challenge League preliminary round 1
2	Transport United	18	13	2	3	51	22	+29	41	
3	Thimphu City	18	12	3	3	50	21	+29	39	
4	Royal Thimphu College	18	9	6	3	38	26	+12	33	
5	Samtse	18	7	3	8	41	51	−10	24	
6	Tensung	18	6	4	8	24	39	−15	22	
7	BFF Academy U-19	18	4	3	11	16	35	−19	15	
8	Phuntsholing Heroes	18	4	2	12	25	53	−28	14	Relegation
9	Tsirang FC	18	3	4	11	25	37	−12	13	
10	Daga United	18	2	1	15	23	73	−50	7	Relegation

(C) Champions

Phuntsholing Heroes withdrew after the season concluded.

== Results ==
Home \ Away	BFF	DAG	PAR	PHU	RTC	SAM	TEN	THC	TRU	TSI
BFF Academy U-19	—	3–1	0–5	0–0	1–1	2–1	0–1		1–4	3–0
Daga United	3–1	—	1–11	1–1	1–2	2–4	0–4	2–7	1–3	2–1
Paro	3–0	6–1	—	6–2	4–3	4–0	5–1	4–1	2–2	2–1
Phuntsholing Heroes	2–1	7–4	1–7	—	0–4	2–5	5–1	0–3	0–3	1–6
Royal Thimphu College	0–1	4–1	0–3	4–1	—	4–2		1–0	2–1	2–1
Samtse	2–2	6–1	1–7	1–0	2–2	—	4–1	1–2	3–7	3–1
Tensung	1–0	3–2	0–8	2–1	2–2	1–1	—	1–3	2–3	1–1
Thimphu City	5–0	2–0		3–0	1–1	6–1	2–1	—	2–1	7–0
Transport United	3–0	3–0	1–0	2–1	4–4		0–1	5–5	—	2–1
Tsirang	1–0	5–0	0–2	0–1	1–1	2–3	1–1	2–2	1–4	—

Legend: Blue = home team win; Yellow = draw; Red = away team win.
For upcoming matches, an "a" indicates there is an article about the rivalry between the two participants.
