= 2021 Bhutan Premier League =

Bhutan Premier League
- Season: 2021
- Champions: Paro
- Relegated: None
- AFC Cup: Paro
- Matches: 90
- Goals: 393 (4.37 per match)
- Top goalscorer: Yeshi Dorji (24 goals)
- Biggest home win: Thimphu City 15–0 Paro Rinpung (11 July 2021)
- Biggest away win: Gelephu 0–10 Thimphu City (3 June 2021)
- Highest scoring: Thimphu City 15–0 Paro Rinpung (11 July 2021)

The 2021 Bhutan Premier League was the tenth season of the unified league, rebranded as the Bhutan Premier League since 2019 (previously the Bhutan National League), the top national football competition in Bhutan, having replaced the A-Division in 2013.

== Teams ==
=== Stadiums and locations ===
Stadium locations of the 2021 Bhutan Premier League

Team	Location	Stadium
Druk Lhayul	Thimphu	Changlimithang Stadium
Gelephu	Thimphu	Changlimithang Stadium
GOMO	Khuruthang	Ugyen Academy Football Field
High Quality United	Thimphu	Changlimithang Stadium
Paro	Paro	Woochu Sports Arena
Paro Rinpung	Paro	Woochu Sports Arena
Tensung	Thimphu	Changlimithang Stadium
Thimphu City	Thimphu	Changlimithang Stadium
Transport United	Thimphu	Changlimithang Stadium
Ugyen Academy	Khuruthang	Ugyen Academy Football Field

== League table ==
Pos	Team	Pld	W	D	L	GF	GA	GD	Pts	Qualification or relegation
1	Paro (C)	18	14	3	1	60	11	+49	45	Qualification for AFC Cup preliminary round 1
2	Thimphu City	18	13	4	1	78	17	+61	43	
3	Transport United	18	13	2	3	65	16	+49	41	
4	High Quality United	18	11	1	6	50	23	+27	34	
5	Druk Lhayul	18	10	3	5	34	19	+15	33	
6	Ugyen Academy	18	8	1	9	27	27	0	25	
7	Tensung	18	6	1	11	18	43	−25	19	
8	GOMO	18	2	1	15	20	59	−39	7	
9	Gelephu	18	2	1	15	16	81	−65	7	
10	Paro Rinpung	18	2	1	15	25	97	−72	7	

Source: Soccerway
(C) Champions
