= Samtse FC =

Bhutanese football club

Samtse
- Full name: Samtse Football Club
- Founded: 2001; 25 years ago 2012; 14 years ago 2023 (refounded)
- Ground: Samtse Dzongkhag Ground
- Capacity: 2,000
- 2025: Bhutan Premier League, 10th of 10 (relegated)
Home colours	Away colours

Samtse Football Club is a professional football club from Samtse, Bhutan, based at the Samtse Dzongkhag Ground. The club’s founding is associated with two dates: 2001, when it existed as an amateur club, and 2012, marking the start of its continuous period of play.

== History ==
A team named Samtse competed in the 2001 season of the A-Division, where they finished in second place, qualifying from their group stage section, but losing 3–0 to Druk Star in the final. It is unclear whether this is the same team however, as the Bhutan Football Federation website states that the club were founded in 2012. The club was most likely established in 2001 as an amateur side, but 2012 is cited as the official date marking the beginning of its continuous period of activity.

The team competed in the inaugural season of the Bhutan National League, representing Samtse District. Their first season of competition was not a successful one, as they lost all ten of their games, and finished bottom of the league, with a −31 goal difference. Even though there was no relegation from the National League, they did not return to competition the following season.
