= FC Terton =

Association football club in Bhutan

Terton
- Full name: Terton Football Club
- Founded: 2014; 11 years ago
- Ground: Changlimithang Stadium
- Capacity: 15,000
Home colours	Away colours

Terton Football Club (also known as FC Tertons or Terton FC) was a Bhutanese football club based in Thimphu which most recently competed in the 2022 Bhutan Premier League Qualifiers. In 2015, they became Bhutan's national champions for the first and only time, and subsequently represented the country in the AFC Cup.

== History ==
Terton made their debut in the 2015 Thimphu League, which they won by three points from Thimphu, collecting the Nu 400,000 first prize and qualifying for the 2015 Bhutan National League. During their inaugural season in the Thimphu League, they lost only twice; a 5–3 defeat to Druk Star and a 3–1 loss to eventual runners-up Thimphu. They were equally successful in their debut season in the National League, beating Thimphu City 4–2 in the final game to confirm the championship, collecting the Nu 10 million first place prize and qualifying for the 2017 AFC Cup.

== Honours ==
- Thimphu League
  - Champions: 2015
- Bhutan National League
  - Champions: 2015

== Performance in AFC competitions ==
- AFC Cup

2017: Preliminary round
