= Phuentsholing United FC =

Bhutanese football club

United Phuentsholing
- Full name: United Phuentsholing Football Club
- Founded: 2018; 8 years ago
- Ground: PSA Phuentsholing Stadium
- Head coach: Madhan Rai
Home colours	Away colours

Phuentsholing United Football Club, also known as United Phuentsholing FC, is a football club from Phuntsholing, Bhutan. The club was founded in 2018. In 2019, they competed in the Bhutan Premier League, the top level of Bhutanese football.
