= Bhutan Clearing FC =

Bhutanese football club

Bhutan Clearing
- Full name: Bhutan Clearing Football Club
- Short name: BCFC
- Founded: 2011; 15 years ago
- Dissolved: 2017; 9 years ago
- Ground: PSA Phuentsholing Stadium
- Capacity: 5,000
- League: Bhutan National League

Bhutan Clearing Football Club was a football club from Phuentsholing, Bhutan, which competed in the Bhutan National League, the top flight of football in Bhutan.

== History ==
The first recorded mention of Bhutan Clearing competing at any level of football in Bhutan is in 2012, when they competed in the B-Division, the third tier of football in Bhutan, when RSSSF reported a team known as Bhutan Clearance competing, though their final position is not recorded. The B-Division is the division below the A-Division, the competition which provides the Thimphu-based qualifiers for the National League. Despite this being a traditionally Thimphu-centred competition, Bhutan Clearing competed and were the only team from outside Thimphu to do so. Their final position is not known, although they can have finished no higher than third, as the final play-off match was contested by BMW FC and Motithang. The only known results for the club from this season are a 4–2 victory over Rigzung and a 3–0 defeat of the Bhutan national under sixteen team.

In 2014, they entered the National League for the first time, one of two teams in addition to Ugyen Academy from outside Thimphu who did. Their first appearance in the National League was a disappointing one, as they finished last in the league, their only point coming from a 2–2 draw with Druk Star. Additionally, outside of this draw, they only scored two more goals, one each against Druk Pol and Druk United and also suffered a 0–16 defeat to Thimphu City. In 2017 they dissolved due to financial reasons.
