= Paro FC =

Association football club in Bhutan

Paro
- Full name: Paro Football Club
- Nickname: The Tigers
- Founded: 2018; 8 years ago
- Ground: Woochu Sports Arena
- Capacity: 1,000
- President: Karma Jigme
- Head coach: Puspalal Sharma
- League: Bhutan Premier League
- 2026: Bhutan Premier League, 1st of 10 (champions)
- Website: parofc.com
Home colours	Away colours

Paro Football Club is a Bhutanese professional football club based in Paro that competes in the Bhutan Premier League, the top level of Bhutanese football.

== History ==
Paro FC competed in the 2018 Bhutan National League after beating Paro United in the qualifying tournament, and finished the season as runners-up behind Transport United. In 2019, the club reached the semi-finals of the first-ever Samtse Championship. During the same season, Paro won its first national league title by winning the 2019 edition of the Bhutan Premier League.

In August 2024, Paro made headlines by signing Japanese international Keisuke Honda, who joined the club on a one-match contract to play in the AFC Challenge League play-off against Nepalese side Church Boys United.

== Current squad ==
As of 28 May 2026

Note: Flags indicate national team as defined under FIFA eligibility rules; some limited exceptions apply. Players may hold more than one non-FIFA nationality.

No.	Pos.	Nation	Player
1	GK	BHU	Gyeltshen Zangpo (captain)
2	DF	GAM	Sidiki Jawara
3	DF	BHU	Tandin Dorji
4	DF	BHU	Ugyen Dorji
5	MF	JPN	Tomoyuki Hanazato
6	DF	PAK	Mamoon Moosa Khan
7	FW	GAM	Abdoulie Baldeh
9	MF	JPN	Taiga Kitajima
10	MF	BHU	Dinesh Gurung
11	FW	BHU	Kinga Wangchuk
12	MF	BHU	Sonam Zangpo
14	DF	BHU	Kezang Dorji

No.	Pos.	Nation	Player
15	DF	BHU	Nima Wangdi
16	MF	BHU	Tsheltrim Namgyal
18	MF	BHU	Phurpa Wangchuk
21	GK	BHU	Heera Nath Roy
22	FW	JPN	Yuta Mishima
24	FW	BHU	Sonam Tshering Dorji
25	FW	GHA	Evan Asante
27	DF	BHU	Leki Mindu
31	GK	BHU	Sherab Gyeltshen
33	DF	PAK	Mohib Ullah Afridi
40	DF	BAN	Tariq Kazi
97	MF	SEN	Richard Sagna

== Honours ==
- Bhutan Premier League
  - Winners (7): 2019, 2021, 2022, 2023, 2024, 2025, 2026
  - Runners-up (1): 2018
- Jigme Dorji Wangchuk Memorial Gold Cup
  - Winners (1): 2019

== Continental record ==
All results list Paro's goal tally first.

Season	Competition	Round	Opposition	Home	Away	Aggregate
2020	AFC Cup	Preliminary round 1	(Sri Lanka) Defenders	2–2	3–3	5–5 (a)
2020	AFC Cup	Preliminary round 2	(India) Bengaluru	0–1	1–9	1–10
2022	AFC Cup	Preliminary round 1	(Maldives) Valencia	1–2 (a.e.t.)		
2023–24	AFC Cup	Preliminary round 1	(Nepal) Machhindra	2–3		
2024–25	AFC Challenge League	Preliminary stage	(Nepal) Church Boys United	2–1		
2024–25	AFC Challenge League	Group stage	(India) East Bengal	2–2		3rd of 4
2024–25	AFC Challenge League	Group stage	(Lebanon) Nejmeh	1–2		3rd of 4
2024–25	AFC Challenge League	Group stage	(Bangladesh) Bashundhara Kings	2–1		3rd of 4
2025–26	AFC Challenge League	Preliminary stage	(Afghanistan) Abu Muslim	1–0		
2025–26	AFC Challenge League	Group stage	(Oman) Al-Shabab	0–1		4th of 4
2025–26	AFC Challenge League	Group stage	(Turkmenistan) Altyn Asyr	1–3		4th of 4
2025–26	AFC Challenge League	Group stage	(Kyrgyzstan) Abdysh-Ata	3–3		4th of 4
2026–27	AFC Challenge League	Preliminary stage	(Afghanistan) Abu Muslim	2–0		
2026–27	AFC Challenge League	Group stage	(Turkmenistan) Ahal	2–2		4th of 4
2026–27	AFC Challenge League	Group stage	(Lebanon) Al-Ansar	1–2		4th of 4
2026–27	AFC Challenge League	Group stage	(Syria) Al-Ittihad Ahli	1–2		4th of 4
