= High Quality United FC =

Association football club in Bhutan

High Quality United
- Full name: High Quality United Football Club
- Founded: 2015; 10 years ago
- Ground: Changlimithang Stadium
- Capacity: 15,000
- President: Bumtap Pema
| Home colours | Away colours |

High Quality United Football Club, also known as High Quality FC, is a Bhutanese football club based in Thimphu. The club currently operates only with youth selections, as the senior squad was disbanded prior to the 2022 season.

== History ==
High Quality United first appeared in the 2017 Thimphu League, in which they won six games, lost seven, and drew once against the Bhutan U-19s with a score of 0–0. They finished their inaugural season in fifth place. As they did not place in the top 3, they did not qualify to the 2017 Bhutan National League, but they were not relegated and competed again in the 2018 Thimphu League.

== Honours ==
- Bhutan Super League
  - Champions: 2020
  - Runners-up: 2019
