= Paro United FC =

Association football club in Bhutan

Paro United
- Full name: Paro United Football Club
- Short name: PUFC
- Founded: 2015; 10 years ago
- Ground: Woochu Sports Arena
Home colours	Away colours

Paro United Football Club was a Bhutanese football club from Paro. The club played at the Woochu Sports Arena. They competed in the 2020 edition of the Bhutan Premier League.

The club was formed by Paro residents and the Thai-Bhutan society.
