= Tensung FC =

Association football club in Bhutan

Tensung
- Full name: Tensung Football Club
- Founded: 2016; 10 years ago
- Ground: MTC Ground
- Owner: Royal Bhutan Army
- League: Bhutan Premier League
- 2026: Bhutan Premier League, 9th of 10

Tensung Football Club is the football section of the Royal Bhutan Army that competes in the Bhutan Premier League, the top tier of Bhutanese football.

== History ==
In Tensung's first Thimphu League season in 2016, the club finished 7th with a goal difference of −28. They registered their first point in April, holding Thimphu FC to a 0–0 draw.
