= Thimphu FC =

Bhutanese association football club

Thimphu
- Full name: Thimphu Football Club
- Nickname: Thunderbolts
- Founded: 2015; 11 years ago
- Ground: Changlimithang Stadium
- Capacity: 15,000
- Head coach: Raj Kumar
- League: Bhutan Premier League
- 2026: Bhutan Premier League, 3rd of 10
Home colours	Away colours

Thimphu Football Club is a Bhutanese football club based in Thimphu that plays in the Bhutan Premier League.

== History ==
In 2015, Thimphu became the first Bhutanese club to hire a foreign coach, Fabio Lopez. However, the Italian coach resigned from the club without coaching a single match, due to difficulties adapting to the lifestyle changes from his native country. The two foreign players signed under coach Lopez remained in the squad for the 2015 season.

== Honours ==
- Bhutan National League
  - Runners-up (1): 2015
- Thimphu League
  - Runners-up (2): 2015, 2016
