= Bhutan Premier League =

Men's professional football league in Bhutan

- Organising body: Bhutan Football Federation (BFF)
- Founded: 2012; 14 years ago (as National League)
- Country: Bhutan
- Confederation: AFC
- Number of clubs: 10
- Level on pyramid: 1
- Relegation to: Bhutan Premier League Qualifiers
- International cup(s): AFC Challenge League; SAFF Club Championship
- Current champions: Paro (7th title) (2026)
- Most championships: Paro (7 titles)

The Bhutan Premier League, currently known as the Bank of Bhutan Premier League due to sponsorship reasons, is the men's highest division of professional football in Bhutan. It also provides Bhutan's entrant for continental competition, the AFC Challenge League.

== Format ==
The Bhutan Premier League operates as the highest level of football in Bhutan. Competing teams in the league play each other twice on a home and away basis. Previously, when the A-Division was the country's top league, all matches were played at Changlimithang, the country's national stadium, making home and away distinctions essentially moot. Whilst the Thimphu-based teams still play their matches at that ground, the regional teams maintain their own stadiums, so that genuine home and away fixtures now take place.

== History ==
League competition in Bhutan got off to a slow start. Although a full ten-team league was set up in 1986, there seems to have been little or no organised football for the next ten years. Between 1996 and 2000 there was some form of organised football, but it is not clear the extent to which this involved teams from outside of Thimphu.

Some form of football whereby national champions were crowned was played between 1996 and 2000, but it was only in 2001 that the A-Division was created.

In 2001, the A-Division was created as a football competition for teams in Thimphu and was the premier league in the country, supplying the Bhutanese representative to the AFC President's Cup. The first season of the A-Division essentially took the form of a national competition, closely mirroring the current format of the National League. A qualifying tournament was held for teams from Thimphu (in which a team from Paro also competed), from which the top teams progressed to Super League, which also included teams from Samtse and Gomtu, and would have included teams from Phuentsholing and Chukha, had they not withdrawn.

However, this was the last time for over a decade that teams from outside of Thimphu would be involved in football at the highest level in Bhutan. In 2011 the A-Division was played only as a single round-robin set of matches in anticipation of the establishment of a true national league.

This did not occur though and it was only in 2012 that the inaugural competition took place, a six team league consisting of the top three teams from that season's A-Division representing Thimphu, namely Drukpol, Yeedzin and Zimdra, together with Phuentsholing (representing Chukha District), Samtse (representing Samtse District) and Ugyen Academy (representing Punakha District). The inaugural league commenced having signed a three-year sponsorship deal with Coca-Cola worth Nu 3 million in total, along with further sponsorship from Tashi Beverages, Druk Air, Zimdra Food and Samden Group, with the aim ultimately to have a football team playing in the National League from each of the 20 Dzongkhags according to the Bhutan Football Federation. Thimphu dominance of Bhutanese football continued initially, with Yeedzin winning the first National League title. Along with the title, they received Nu 400,000 in prize money, with second-place Drukpol receiving Nu 200,000 and Ugyen Academy Nu 100,000 for their third-place finish.

However, teams from outside the capital city soon proved that they could compete with those who had considerably more top flight experience the following season, as Ugyen Academy became the first non-Thimphu team to take the title, and with it the Nu 400,000 in prize money, with second and third place teams Yeedzin and Thimphu City taking Nu 200,000 and Nu 100,000 respectively. The number of teams based outside of Thimphu decreased in 2013 following the withdrawal of Samtse, a situation which continued in 2014 following the withdrawal of Phuentsholing as well, although they were replaced by Bhutan Clearing, competing for the first time in the National League. In an attempt to attract more non-Thimphu teams into the competition, the federation increased the prize money from Nu 400,000 to 700,000 for the winners. The runners-up were given Nu 400,000, increased by 200,000 from the previous year, and the third-placed team was awarded Nu 200,000. No AFC President's Cup place was awarded to the team finishing in first place this season, because the 2014 edition was the final edition held.

In 2019, structural changes took place in the league system and the competitions were rebranded. The top tier was renamed as the Bhutan Premier League, and the qualifying competition as the Bhutan Super League. The Super League ceased after the 2020 season and was replaced by the qualifying tournament for the Premier League.

== Current clubs ==
As of the 2026 season

- BFF Academy U-19
- Drukpa
- Paro
- Royal Thimphu College
- Tensung
- Thimphu
- Thimphu City
- Transport United
- Tsirang
- Ugyen Academy

== List of winners ==
Season	Winner	Runner-up
2012–13	Yeedzin	Drukpol
2013	Ugyen Academy	Yeedzin
2014	Druk United	Ugyen Academy
2015	Terton	Thimphu
2016	Thimphu City	Druk United
2017	Transport United	Thimphu City
2018	Transport United	Paro
2019	Paro	Transport United
2020	Thimphu City	Ugyen Academy
2021	Paro	Thimphu City
2022	Paro	Thimphu City
2023	Paro	Thimphu City
2024	Paro	Transport United
2025	Paro	Thimphu City
2026	Paro	Thimphu City

== Performances by club ==
Performances in the Bhutan Premier League by club
Club	Winners	Runners-up	Years won	Years runner-up
Paro	7	1	2019, 2021, 2022, 2023, 2024, 2025, 2026	2018
Thimphu City	2	6	2016, 2020	2017, 2021, 2022, 2023, 2025, 2026
Transport United	2	2	2017, 2018	2019, 2024
Ugyen Academy	1	2	2013	2014, 2020
Yeedzin	1	1	2012–13	2013
Druk United	1	1	2014	2016
Terton	1	0	2015	—
Drukpol	0	1	—	2012–13
Thimphu	0	1	—	2015

== Media coverage ==
Prior to the start of the 2023 season, the Bhutan Premier League was broadcast by Eleven Sports, with selected matches also broadcast by the Bhutan Broadcasting Service. From 2022 to 2024, the league was broadcast live on FIFA+, and also locally (limited to Thimphu only) on Norling and Etho Metho cable services.

== See also ==
- Football in Bhutan
- Jigme Dorji Wangchuk Memorial Gold Cup
- Bhutan Women's National League
