= Thimphu City FC =

Association football club in Bhutan

Thimphu City
- Full name: Thimphu City Football Club
- Nicknames: The Citizens; The Reds
- Short name: TCFC
- Founded: 2012; 14 years ago
- Ground: Changlimithang Stadium
- Capacity: 15,000
- President: Hishey Tshering
- Head coach: Rodolfo Zapata
- League: Bhutan Premier League
- 2026: Bhutan Premier League, 2nd of 10
- Website: thimphucityfc.com
| Home colours | Away colours | Third colours |

Thimphu City Football Club is a Bhutanese professional football club based in Thimphu that competes in the Bhutan Premier League, the top level of football in Bhutan. Founded in 2012, they qualified for the inaugural Bhutan National League in the same year. Formerly known as Zimdra FC, the club was refounded as Thimphu City FC in 2012 and again qualified for the 2013 Bhutan National League, finishing second behind eventual winners Yeedzin. They have won the Thimphu League and the first National League title in 2016. They also have a futsal section.

== History ==
The club was founded in 2012 as formal successor of Zimdra FC, which first recorded involvement in top-flight football in Bhutan in 2011, when they finished as runners-up to eventual winners Yeedzin in a truncated season consisting of a single round-robin set of matches in anticipation of the commencement of a new Bhutan National League.

The following season was also reasonably successful. Zimdra again finished as runners-up in the A-Division, this time being beaten to the title by Drukpol, despite beating Drukpol in the final game of the season. During that campaign, they went through the whole competition unbeaten, dropping points only in a draw with Drukpol and two draws with Yeedzin. In finishing second in the A-Division, they qualified for the inaugural National League, though did not fare quite so well in this competition, finishing fifth out of six competing teams, winning five and drawing one of their ten games. Zimdra kept the name in various veteran tournaments.

For a third season in a row, Thimphu City, as senior team had now been renamed, finished as runners-up in the A-Division, winning five and drawing one of their eight games, but finishing five points behind champions Yeedzin. they performed better than the previous season in the National League finishing in third place, comfortably ahead of Drukpol, with five wins and three draws from their eight games, but three points behind champions Ugyen Academy. Prior to 2013, Thimphu City had been in a difficult financial situation. Owner Hishey Tshering was spending a lot of his own money at the time, paying salaries and covering school fees for younger players in a football league where no money is generated from gate receipts and sponsorship is thin on the ground. A friend of Tshering's and some other private sponsors contributed money so that the club was able to pay between 20 and 40 thousand Ngultrum to its players.

At the halfway point of the 2014 season, Thimphu looked like they might finally be able to go that step further and claim a first A-Division title, as they led by three points from Drukpol with five wins and a draw from six matches, dropping points only against Druk Star. However, they slipped up in the penultimate round of matches, losing 5–1 to Druk United. Thimphu had played all their matches and led the league by a point. However, that loss to Druk United meant they were now only a point behind with a game still to play. Druk United thumped Druk Star 8–3 in this final game to take the A-Division title and consign Thimphu to a fourth-straight second place, though they could take consolation in the fact that they had again qualified for the National League.

Thimphu City enjoyed a strong start to the 2014 National League season, leading the league at the halfway point, having dropped points only in an opening-day 4–0 defeat to eventual winners Druk United. The second half of the season was less successful. Although they achieved a season-high victory 16–0 against bottom-placed Bhutan Clearing, they only won one other game and slipped to a final position of third, behind Druk United and Ugyen Academy.

== Honours ==
- Thimphu League/A-Division
  - Winners: 2016, 2017
  - Runners-up: 2011, 2012, 2013, 2014, 2018
- Bhutan National/Premier League
  - Winners: 2016, 2020
  - Runners-up: 2017, 2021, 2022, 2023, 2025, 2026
- BFF President's Cup
  - Runners-up: 2022
- National Futsal League
  - Winners: 2016, 2018

== Continental record ==
All results list Thimphu City's goal tally first.

| Season | Competition | Round | Club | Home | Away | Agg. |
|---|---|---|---|---|---|---|
| 2017 | AFC Cup | Preliminary round | (Maldives) Club Valencia | 0–0 | 0–3 | 0–3 |
| 2021 | AFC Cup | Preliminary round 1 | (Maldives) Eagles | 0–2 | | |
