= Football in Bhutan =

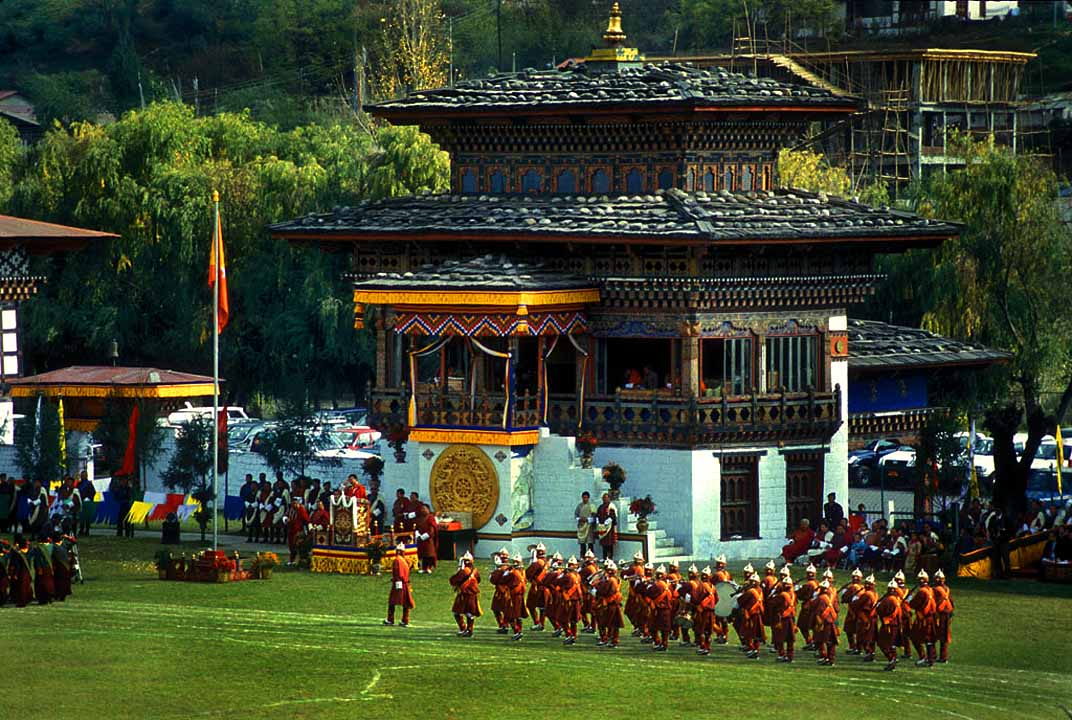
- A parade at Changlimithang, the home of football in Bhutan
- Country: Bhutan
- Governing body: Bhutan Football Federation
- National teams: Men's national team Women's national team National futsal team Women's national futsal team various youth teams

National competitions
- Bhutan Premier League; BPL Qualifiers; Dzongkhag (District) leagues Jigme Dorji Wangchuk Memorial Gold Cup; BFF President's Cup; Coronation Championship; Women's National League; Women's National League Qualifier; Women's District League

International competitions
- AFC Challenge League; AFC Women's Champions League; SAFF Club Championship; SAFF Club Women's Championship; SAFF Futsal Championship; AFC Asian Cup; FIFA World Cup; FIFA Women's World Cup; Women's Asian Cup; SAFF Championship; SAFF Women's Championship; AFC U-20 Asian Cup; SAFF U-20 Championship; AFC U-17 Asian Cup; SAFF U-17 Championship

Football is a sport with a comparatively brief history in Bhutan, having had an initial period of favour in the mid-twentieth century, when it was first introduced to the country by visiting teachers from India and Europe. It has only achieved significantly renewed popularity in the early 2000s, following the advent of satellite television broadcasting, with the national sport historically being archery. Consequently, the domestic game was underdeveloped. After the establishment of an initial league in the late 1980s, little in the way of recorded competition took place until the mid-1990s when a formal championship, the A-Division, was created. Football became the most popular sport in Bhutan.

However, although this was nominally a national league, it was in reality merely a competition for teams based in Thimphu. This championship developed into its current three-tiered format, but remained resolutely Thimphu-focused until an annual, true national competition, Bhutan Premier League, was established in 2012 (as National League). Due to financial and transportation issues, this competition has only added at most another three teams to the overall number competing. Throughout the history of football in Bhutan, its clubs have remained in the third tier of continental competition within the Asian Football Confederation (AFC), the AFC President's Cup, and have more often than not struggled to compete in this competition. They have had slightly more success within their regional federation, the South Asian Football Federation (SAFF), but again have consistently been recognised as one of the weaker teams.

The national team was ranked by FIFA as the worst in the world, without a single ranking point, and fourth worst (including non-FIFA teams) in the all-time Elo ratings. The team played irregularly, mainly competing in the SAFF Championship or the qualifying rounds of the AFC Challenge Cup. The 2018 FIFA World Cup was their first attempt at qualifying. They beat Sri Lanka in the first round 2–1 on aggregate and qualified for the second round, where they finished bottom of the group after losing all 8 games, including 15-0 and 12-0 defeats to Qatar and China respectively.

== History ==
=== Beginnings ===
In the same way that there is uncertainty around the manner in which football as a sport in general came to be, so there is equal uncertainty around how the game was ultimately brought to Bhutan. During the colonial period, Bhutan, although it had signed treaties with the government of India which ceded control of its defence and foreign relations to the British, continued to function as an independent state and was never under the direct rule of the British government in India. Whereas Indians were introduced to football by the British government, the lack of a permanent British presence in Bhutan meant that foreign sports were not played there. The arrival of football in Bhutan was very closely linked with the opening of schools in Haa and Paro in the 1950s, as foreign teachers, mainly from India, but some Europeans were recruited. The Bhutan Football Federation note that in the beginning there was little in the way of formal facilities or equipment and the game was played on stone covered pitches with a ball made out of a bundle of clothes. The game continued to grow as more Bhutanese went abroad, mainly to India, to study and helped increase the popularity of the sport upon their return, though the game was still considered to be just that and was not really developed during this period.

The main centres for football during the 1960s were Phuentsholing and Samtse, close to the border with India, where hastily arranged teams would travel back and forth over the border to play neighbouring tea gardens. In 1968, a team nominally representing Bhutan, but essentially consisting of foreign players travelled to Calcutta to compete in the Indian Independence Cup. Over time football gradually increased in popularity until it was seen as an essential part of the school curriculum, with numerous school tournaments established within Thimphu. Teams used to travel from all over the country to take part, some coming from as far away as Khaling. However, regardless of the popularity of the game amongst the Bhutanese, the notion of a Bhutan "national team" consisting almost entirely of foreigners persisted for some time, and this team would regularly travel abroad to take part in international competitions such as the ANFA Cup, with a team consisting of around 60% Indian players. These Indian players were brought to Bhutan and given jobs within the Civil Service, although essentially their job was to play football. Such a situation could not last however, and in time these players either retired or returned to their home country creating a vacuum of talent which would seriously affect the national team in the years to come.

=== 1980s ===
Although the game has been played in Bhutan for over eighty years, Football as an organised, competitive sport came to Bhutan comparatively late in the global history of the game. The national men's team played their first match only in 1982 in the ANFA cup against Nepal, which was lost 3–1. Somewhat counter-intuitively, a formal national federation was only established after this, with the Bhutan Football Association being founded in 1983, though its name was quickly changed to the Bhutan Football Federation later that year.

Under the auspices of this organisation, and without any apparent organised competition, the national team competed unsuccessfully in two editions of the South Asian Games football tournament, being beaten in both their games each time without scoring a single goal.

The first recorded national championship was not held until 1986, when ten teams comprising a variety of schools, colleges and public departments competed in a single round-robin set of matches, with the Royal Bhutan Army winning the first national title. This competition did not help the national team prepare for the South Asian Games the following year, where again they were beaten in both games.

=== 1990s ===
The establishment of a formal football league appears to have done little for the popularity of the organised game in Bhutan however, as no records exist to indicate that any form of organised competition occurred between 1986 and 1996. After the initial season, the popularity of the game waned and was only revived in the mid-1990s by the monk Khyentse Norbu. However, during this time, the federation was admitted to the AFC in 1993.

Organised domestic football was finally re-established in 1996 and saw the emergence of the first dominating team in Bhutanese football as Druk Pol won the title, something they would go on to do for the next five years. The national team also returned to the international stage, competing in the South Asian Games for the first time in twelve years in 1997, but again the revival of domestic football did little to improve the country's performances as they lost all three games, scoring just a single goal.

Television was banned in Bhutan until 1999, but prior to this the royal administration granted special exemption to a number of venues, mainly those who already had a sporting association, to show broadcasts of the 1998 World Cup. These proved to be extremely popular, with people walking some distance to see the matches, their first exposure, not just to TV, but also to foreign football.

=== 2000s ===
The turn of the century saw the national team become affiliated to FIFA, and compete at a continental level for the first time, as they entered the AFC Asian Cup. This was arguably the lowest point to date in the national team's history, as they extended their losing run to fifteen games in all competitions and suffered a record loss to date, 20–0 against Kuwait. However, football was undeniably popular in the country despite this; The Cup, the first feature-length film from Bhutan, filmed in 2000, tells the tale of monks in the country who sneak out of their monastery to watch satellite broadcasts of the world cup, a story said to be based on fact and something which is echoed in real life nearly ten years later.

The following year saw the formal establishment of the national championship as the A-Division, with that season's competition being the first on record to be a genuine attempt at a nationwide competition, involving not just teams from Thimphu, but also teams from Paro, Samtse and Gomtu.

The national team also recorded their first ever win after twenty years of competition when they defeated Montserrat 4–0 at the national stadium, Changlimithang. This fixture between what were then the two lowest ranked teams in the world, known as The Other Final, was specially arranged by Dutch documentary film maker, Johan Kramer, to coincide with the 2002 World Cup Final. By this time the domestic championship, although essentially Thimphu-based, had expanded to a two-tiered pyramid consisting of nine teams each.

In 2003, the league system grew by a further tier to incorporate a C-Division as well. About 12 to 14 C division clubs were expected to participate. Based on the performance in the national league, the two best teams from C division are promoted to the B division. Likewise, two B division teams move up to A division. On the other hand, the weakest team in each division is demoted to a lower division, creating a genuine league system for the first time in the country. In addition to this, the national team enjoyed one of their most successful seasons, when they qualified top of their group for the 2004 Asian Cup, defeating Guam 6–0 and drawing 0–0 with Mongolia. The victory over Guam is their highest scoring victory to date and the two match unbeaten run their current best set of results.

In the next few years football in Bhutan stagnated. The domestic leagues quickly lost their participants from outside of Thimphu and Transport United took over Druk Pol's position as the dominant team in the country, winning four back-to-back titles. During this time, clubs in Bhutan began to compete in continental competition. Classified by the AFC as a developing footballing nation, the country gained a place in the inaugural President's Cup. With their four consecutive titles, Transport United were regular competitors between 2005 and 2009. However, they struggled to compete against superior opposition, winning only two games out of twelve in their four appearances, both of which were against the Pakistan Army in 2006 and 2007.

The national team played sporadically and with little success during the first half of the 2000s, a 0–0 draw against Brunei being their only positive result. They were however, to produce their best performance in any tournament to date in the 2008 SAFF Championship, coming second in their group and losing in the semi-finals against India 2–1 following a last minute goal in extra time.

Throughout the first decade of the twenty-first century, the A-Division struggled to establish itself as a genuinely competitive league. Although Transport United faded following their fourth consecutive title in 2008, and were ultimately relegated to the lower divisions in 2012, Yeedzin rose to take their place as the superior team in the league. Furthermore, the difference in ability between the teams in the A-division, despite their only ever being seven or eight competing clubs, was often marked and result in some extremely high scoring games. For example, in the 2007 season, the Royal Institute of Health Sciences conceded 15 goals in a game against Yeedzin and twenty goals in their defeat to Transport United. In the game between Transport United and RIHS FC, Passang Tshering scored seventeen goals. Sources indicate that the most goals scored by a single player in a game is 16, scored by Panagiotis Pontikos of Olympos Xylofagou against SEK Ayios Athanasios in May 2007 and by Stephane Stanis for RC Strasbourg in the 1940s. It would appear therefore, that Pontikos, having equalled a record that had stood for over 60 years, saw it broken only a few days later.

=== 2010s ===
Following on from their comparative success at the 2008 SAFF Championship, the national team found themselves unable to push on and build on their achievements and have yet to register a victory since. A number of friendly matches against Nepal have produced some close encounters, a 2–1 loss in 2009 and 1–0 and 2–1 losses in a pair of back to back friendlies in 2011. Indeed, outside of these three friendlies, in their twelve official matches between their performance in the 2008 SAFF Championship and the corresponding 2013 edition, they only managed to score two goals, one through Nawang Dhendup in a 4–1 loss to Bangladesh and the second from Chencho Gyeltshen in an 8–1 thrashing at the hands of Afghanistan.

In 2011, the Bhutan Football Federation intended to redevelop the domestic league structure, attempting to create a true national league to encourage participation from teams outside of Thimphu. Unfortunately, this did not occur that season, but the inaugural edition of the national league took place in 2012–13. The A-Division continues to exist as a competition for Thimphu clubs, but it is no longer the top level of football in the country. Instead, it acts as a qualifying round for Thimphu, with the top clubs in that competition qualifying for that season's National League competition. This league attracted several other teams from Punakha, Phuentsholing and Samtse although, whilst the A-Division teams have remained constant, there has been a degree of change between the regional competing clubs to date. Clubs from outside Thimphu have proved to be competitive however, with Ugyen Academy winning the league in 2013 and becoming the first Bhutanese club from outside the capital city to compete in continental competition. It is hoped that in the coming years the National League will involve teams from across the whole country.

Bhutan made their first attempt to qualify for the FIFA World Cup entering the qualifiers for the 2018 edition and winning their first ever qualifying match against Sri Lanka in the Preliminary Round. In preparation for their qualifying campaign, and in an attempt to improve the overall standard of football in the country and attract more players, the Bhutan Football Federation offered a monthly salary of Nu 10,000 to all players in the main national squad who are not currently on federation scholarships. Current players in the national squad responded to this favourably noting that up to that point parents did not encourage their children to look to football as a career as there was no money in it.

== Financial situation ==
Despite the fact that Bhutan has been one of the weakest teams in the world from both domestic and national perspective, the sport continues to enjoy huge popularity throughout the country. When the World Cup trophy was brought to Bhutan, prior to the 2014 World Cup as part of a ninety-country tour by FIFA, thousands gathered at Changlimithang just to glimpse it. Even though this popular support for the game exists, clubs used to struggle financially, with greater interest in European leagues than domestic competition. Little to no income is generated from the paltry crowds that attend domestic fixtures, as entry is normally free. Instead, clubs used to be reliant on the generosity and passion of individual sponsors, with football federation which was able to provide them with Nu 100,000 per season and Nu 20,000 for travel expenses, so professional players were rarity in the country. Attempts to bring in foreign players were often stymied by stringent immigration rules, although when applications have been successful, there has been significant increase in attendances.

Financial restrictions also have a detrimental effect on the progress of the national team. The Nu 4,000 stipend paid to international footballers was withdrawn by Bhutan Football Federation, and players such as Yeshey Dorji were forced to retire from international football. Indeed, Bhutan before had only one player who could genuinely be regarded as fully professional. Chencho signed a Nu 1,000,000 a year contract with Indian side Royal Wahingdoh, although his namesake Chencho Gyeltshen was the latest successful example. However, the situation has been much better since 2015.

== League system ==
=== Bhutan Premier League ===
The Bhutan Premier League is the highest level of football in Bhutan. Established in 2012 as National League, it replaced the A-Division as the competition providing Bhutan's participant in continental competitions. The league currently consists of qualifiers (Super League) which provide Premier League spots, in addition to a selection of regional clubs. The teams play each other on a home and away basis and the national champion was earned a place in the AFC Cup. It was rebranded as BPL in 2019.

=== BPL Qualifiers ===
Prior to the commencement of the National League, the A-Division was the lone highest level of football in Bhutan and previously provided Bhutan's entrant to the AFC President's Cup. It was rebranded as Bhutan Super League in 2019. Another system change introduced the BPL Qualifiers in 2022.

=== Pyramid structure ===
| Level | League(s) / Division(s) |
|---|---|
| 1 | Bhutan Premier League; 10 clubs - various relegations |
| 2 (qualifiers) | BPL Qualifiers; 7 clubs – various promotions |
| 2 | Dzongkhag (District) leagues various clubs – various promotions |

== Men's national teams ==
=== Senior team ===
The Bhutan national men's football team represents Bhutan in international football and play their home games at the national stadium, Changlimithang. It is one of the younger national teams in the world having played its first match in 1982. The team are currently one of the very weakest in the world and are, as of 17 July 2014 ranked 46th and last in the Asian Football Confederation with zero points and 208th and joint last globally in the FIFA World Rankings with San Marino on zero points. Their highest ranking achieved was 187th, which they last reached in December 2008 following their semi-final performance in the 2008 SAFF Championship. From that high point, they slipped down the rankings to last place in December 2012 to join San Marino and the Turks and Caicos Islands in 207th. They have remained rooted to the bottom ever since, having lost all their competitive fixtures since then and fell to 208th place following the admission to FIFA of South Sudan in July 2014. The team are also ranked extremely low on the all time Elo ratings at 231st out of 234. The only FIFA-affiliated nation below them are American Samoa, with the other two spots taken by the Northern Marianas Islands and Palau. The team's joint top scorers are Passang Tshering and Wangay Dorji both with five goals in twenty appearances.

=== Junior teams ===
For a period of time, the Bhutan Football Federation ran an U-19 men's team. The team did not compete on the international stage, but did take part in a number of editions of the A-Division. They won the B-Division in 2005 and were promoted to the A-Division, but struggled to compete against the senior club teams and stopped competing at the end of the 2011 season.

A U-18 team began competing in the A-Division in 2014, although they did not meet with much success in their debut season, losing all their games but one, their only victory being a 4–2 victory over Yeedzin. They have yet to compete on the international stage.

The Bhutan national under-17 football team represents Bhutan in men's international under-17 football. The team is controlled by the governing body for football in Bhutan, the Bhutan Football Federation, which is currently a member of the Asian Football Federation and the regional body the South Asian Football Federation. Of all the nation's junior teams, only the under-17 team has played on the international stage. They have played sporadically since their first foray into international football in 2004, competing exclusively either in the qualifying rounds for the AFC U-17 Asian Cup or the SAFF U-16 Championship. The team are one of the weakest teams in their age group within both their continental and regional federations, having never qualified for the competition proper of the AFC U-16 Championship. They have played only nineteen competitive games in their entire history, losing eighteen of them, their only result coming in the form of a 0–0 draw with Pakistan in the 2013 SAFF U-16 Championship, conceding 102 goals along the way whilst scoring only seven in reply. Taking part in the 2014 AFC U-16 Championship qualification, their most recent series of matches, they lost all three of their games, including a 12–0 defeat to Tajikistan.

== Futsal ==
The national team first took part in competitive futsal in the 2005 AFC Futsal Championship preliminary round, but suffered heavy losses. Prior to entering this competition, Bhutan was one of only 11 members of the AFC not to have introduced the sport. The eleven-a-side team spent a month at the Sports Complex Basketball Court in Thimphu practicing the game, with two Thai coaches, Mr. Somjit and Mr. Song Pong, in preparation for the tournament. Following this, as the promotion of futsal by national associations was mandated by the AFC, the Bhutan Football Federation expressed a desire to introduce the game into schools using pre-existing basketball and volleyball courts.

Significant criticism was directed at the Bhutan Football Federation in national media about their approach to the promotion of futsal in the years following the poor performance in the AFC Futsal Championship. Despite receiving Nu 100,000,000 from FIFA between 2005 and 2009, in addition to their obligation to promote futsal as part of the AFC, it was alleged that none of this money was used for this purpose and that the Bhutan Football Federation did nothing to introduce or promote the game. By 2010, futsal was still taking place very much on an informal basis, with tournaments being organised by pupils in schools rather than formally by the BFF. At the start of 2010 there was still no dedicated futsal pitch in the entire country and players were having to continue to use basketball courts. The BFF were still aspirational about the game though, providing training in coaching the game, but claimed they lacked the finances to really drive the development of the sport in the country. Matters appeared to have hardly changed a year later when tennis courts were still being used by players in lieu of proper facilities. Few open tournaments were occasionally played, but it was not until late 2013 that the first true National Futsal – Minifootball club championship, won by Terton, took place. This competition was played in a league format and consisted of eight teams in a tournament formally organised by the BFF. Not only did teams from Thimphu took part, but also teams from further afield, such as Ugyen Academy, as well as Paro in later editions.

A national team was selected at very short notice for the 4th Asian Indoor and Martial Arts Games held in Incheon, Korea, in 2013. In their first game, they were soundly beaten 29–1 by Thailand, despite scoring through Dawa Dhendup in the first minute. The team is currently ranked 150th in the world futsal rankings.

== Women's football ==
Initially, Bhutan entered a national team to the 2010 and 2012 SAFF Women's Championships without having either any formal women's competition, nor any qualified female coaches in the country, though there were apparently 200 registered female players in Bhutan in 2000. Prior to their entry into international football, a women's competition was established in Bhutan for the first time, supported by a grant from FIFA and run by the Bhutan Football Federation. Because of the very under-developed state of women's football in Bhutan at this time, club teams did not exist and so the tournament consisted of teams representing individual Dzongkhags. This competition was used not only to increase the popularity of football amongst women in the country, but also to act as means of identifying and coaching players who would form the first ever Bhutan women's national football squad. The first open women's tournament was not held until 2013, and was a tournament aimed more at schoolgirls than women of all ages. Prior to this, the Bhutan Football Federation had only begun to organise the first Asian Football Confederation's Women "C" Certificate Coaching course in July 2013 in response to an increase in popularity of the game among women. A German coach travelled to Bhutan to provide training, which was attended by eighteen women from a number of dzongkhags.

== Women's national team ==
The Bhutan women's national football team represents Bhutan in international women's football and was formed very recently. The team is currently technically unranked as they have been inactive for more than eighteen months. However, they have more ranking points currently than Antigua and Barbuda, Aruba, Botswana, the Comoros and the Turks and Caicos Islands, so unlike the men's team could not be considered the worst in the world based on ranking points. Their highest ranking to date is 115 in December 2013.

== Football stadiums in Bhutan ==
| Stadium | Capacity | City | Tenants | Image |
|---|---|---|---|---|
| Changlimithang Stadium | 15,000 | Thimphu | Bhutan national football team | |

== Attendances ==
The average attendance per top-flight football league season and the club with the highest average attendance:

| Season | League average | Best club | Best club average |
|---|---|---|---|
| 2025 | 393 | Paro | 713 |

Source: League page on Wikipedia

== See also ==
- Lists of stadiums
