= Chencho Nio =

Bhutanese footballer (born 1985)

Personal information
- Full name: Chencho Nio
- Date of birth: 2 October 1985 (age 41)
- Place of birth: Thimphu, Bhutan
- Height: 5 ft 11 in (1.80 m)
- Position: Forward

Youth career
- 2002–2003: Druk Star

Senior career*
Years	Team	Apps	(Gls)
2004–2010	Yeedzin		
2010–2012	Royal Wahingdoh	83	(24)
2012–2013	Luangmal	6	(2)
2015–2018	Thimphu City FC		
2019–2020	Paro FC	25	(6)
2021	High Quality United	17	(8)
2026	Thimphu FC		

International career^{‡}
2003–2019	Bhutan	21	(1)
- * Club domestic league appearances and goals ‡ National team caps and goals as of 11 June 2019

Chencho Nio (born 2 October 1985) is a Bhutanese professional footballer. He has experience playing in the I-League 2nd Division, the second tier of football in India. He became the first Bhutanese full-time player by moving to Royal Wahingdoh in 2010. He made his first appearance for the Bhutan national football team in 2003.

== Club career ==
Chencho began his playing career at the age of seventeen for Druk Star in the Bhutan A-Division in 2002. Druk Star had two mediocre seasons while Chencho was playing for them finishing fifth in 2003 following an unknown placing the previous season.

He moved to Yeedzin in 2004. In his first four seasons with Yeedzin, the club was very much a mid table team during a period in which Transport United dominated domestic football in Bhutan. in 2008 Yeedzin produced their best performance to that point and Chencho was part of the team that won both the league and cup. They finished the league season unbeaten, four points ahead of runners-up Transport United, dropping points in only two games, including a 1–1 draw with Choden FC, the Bhutan U-19 team whilst also beating Rigzung 20–0 in the second half of the season. They won the 2008 A-Division Knock-Out Tournament, beating Royal Bhutan Army 4–3 in the final.

The following season, despite scoring more goals than any other team and more than the bottom half of the table managed combined and with scorelines of 10–2, 20–0 and 16–1 against Rigzung and Druk Athletic twice respectively, they were unable to retain their league title in the 2009 season, losing three games throughout the course of the season and finishing five points behind Druk Star, who ended the season unbeaten. They were equally unfortunate in the Club Cup Championship. Despite beating Nangpa 12–0 in the quarter-finals and Choden 4–1 in the semi-finals, they lost 0–1 to Druk Star in the final as the mirrored what Yeedzin had achieved the previous season.

2009 was also the first season that Yeedzin represented Bhutan in continental competition, their victory in the previous season's league competition meaning that they were awarded Bhutan's berth in the 2009 AFC President's Cup. They were drawn in Group C for the Group Stage, along with Dordoi-Dynamo Naryn of Kyrgyzstan, Kanbawza of Burma and Phnom Penh Crown of Cambodia. They travelled to Bishkek, where all the group games were played, but were beaten in all three games, conceding fourteen goals and scoring only three and did not progress.

Yeedzin bounced straight back the following season with another unbeaten season, finishing nine points clear of Druk Pol to give Chencho his second championship, dropping points only once; in a 0–0 draw against Druk Pol.

Following his performances both domestically and in continental football, Chencho earned himself a move to Royal Wahingdoh in the Indian I-League 2nd Division. In doing so, he became the first Bhutanese player to be able to call himself a full-time professional player, signing a contract worth Nu 1,000,000 per season. In his first season, his new club finished unbeaten in their group, but were unable to finish in the top two in the final stage and so remained in the second division. The following season, Chencho moved to Luangmual, also in the I-League Second Division.

== International career ==
Chencho has been capped 35 times for the Bhutan national football team. He notably took part in the 2013 SAFF Championship, playing in two of Bhutan's three group games; the 2–8 loss to the Maldives and the 0–3 loss to Afghanistan.

== Personal life ==
Prior to his move to Royal Wahingdoh, Chencho juggled football with MBA studies and job at a private company.

== Honours ==
Royal Wahingdoh

- Shillong Premier League: 2011, 2012
