= Druk Stars FC =

Association football club in Bhutan

Druk Stars
- Full name: Druk Stars Football Club
- Founded: 1998; 28 years ago (as Druk Star FC)
- Dissolved: 2020; 6 years ago
- Ground: Changlimithang Stadium
- Capacity: 15,000
Home colours	Away colours

Druk Stars Football Club, sometimes referred to as Druk Star, was a Bhutanese football club from Thimphu. Founded in 1998, the team have won the national championship twice. They competed in the A-Division from 2002 through to 2010, winning their first title in 2002 and a second in 2009. They were absent from the A-Division in 2011, but played and won the 2012 B-Division. Returning to the top flight, they qualified for the National League for the first time in 2014. In addition to their two A-Division and one B-Division title, they have also represented Bhutan in the AFC President's Cup in 2010.

After the 2020 season, the club was dissolved following the decision of the Bhutan Football Federation to impose a lifetime ban on the club owner for match fixing during the 2020 season.

== History ==
=== 1997–2000 ===
Druk Star was formed by Thinley Dorji, a teacher at Changangkha Junior High School, as a medium to give the students at the school something to do. The beginnings of the club were difficult as they had no funds and lacked even a formal coach. However, sponsorship from local companies Pe Khang Enterprises and Lhazeen Printers provided the club with sufficient money to begin progress. In 1999, the club reached the finals of the B-Division and earned promotion to the 2000 A-Division for the first time. Unfortunately, details do not exist to show how they performed during this season, however, they clearly did enough to remain in the top flight as they were present the following season. In addition to players from the local school, the club strengthened their squad by attracting players from Sherubtse College.

=== 2001–2005 ===
The first detailed record of Druk Star participating in the top flight of Bhutanese football is during the 2001 season. They took part in the Thimphu League, which acted as a qualifying tournament for the main competition. Details are scant, although it is known that Drukpol, Druk Star, Paro and Thimphu were also involved. Few results are known, the club drew with Thimphu and Drukpol, but lost in the final match of the competition to Paro, but it is known that Druk Stars were not particularly successful in the competition and did not qualify for that season's A-Division tournament. However, following the withdrawal of Phuentsholing and Chukka F.C., Druk Stars entered as replacement. they were drawn in Group B for the first stage alongside Samtse and Gomtu, beating Gomtu 5–0 in the first game and Samtse 2–1 to progress to the semi-finals. There they faced Drukpol on August 14, beating them 1–0 to progress to the final with Dorji scoring in the 21st minute. In the final at Changlimithang, they once again faced Samtse, who had beaten Thimphu 3–1 in the other semi-final. Again they were victorious, winning 3–0 with a goal after ten minutes from Karma Jambayang and two more in the second half from Jigme Tobgay in the 68th minute and Sonam Gyeltshen in the 81st to record their first national championship.

Details for the following season are incomplete as well. Although it is known that Druk Star competed in the A-Division and that they beat RSTA and RBP 5–0 and Paro 2–0, their final position is not known. All that is known is that since the title was won by Drukpol, they could not have finished first.

In 2003, Druk Star had a mediocre season, winning three and drawing two of their eight games to finish in fifth place out of nine competing teams, a point ahead of Yeedzin, two points behind Royal Bhutan Army but nine points behind winners Drukpol, who finished the season unbeaten.

Their performance the next year is unknown. At roughly the halfway stage of the season, they were in fourth place on ten points, behind Transport United on goal difference, one point behind second place Drukpol and three points behind then leaders Yeedzin. All that is known about their final position is that they could not have finished higher than second, as Transport United won the league and was Bhutan's representative in the 2005 AFC President's Cup.

2005 was another mediocre season for Druk Star as far as league competition is concerned, as they finished in fourth place out of seven entrants in that season's A-Division, winning four and drawing two of their twelve games. They finished three points ahead of Royal Bhutan Army, but achieved only half the number of points gained by second and third-place finishers Drukpol and Yeedzin. They were more successful in the A-Division Knock-out Tournament. They beat Royal Bhutan Army 4–1 on penalties following a 1–1 draw in normal time to progress to the final held on September 8. There they faced Drukpol, where, despite two goals from Navin Gurung and an own goal, they lost 5–3 to finish runners up.

=== 2006–2010 ===
The following season is also lacks details. Druk Star definitely competed, as it is known that they beat Choden 4–1 and drew 1–1 with Drukpol. Their final position however, is not known, although they could not have finished first as Transport United won their third consecutive title that season, with Royal Bhutan Army and Drukpol finishing third and fourth respectively.

The next year saw their best recorded league performance since their title-winning season in 2002, as they finished third in the A-Division, behind Transport United, who won their fourth consecutive title and Drukpol. They were unable to replicate this performance the following season. At the halfway stage, they were in fourth place, on goal difference ahead of Drukpol with three wins and a draw from their seven games. Their final position is again not known, but with Yeedzin winning the title, Transport United coming second and Royal Bhutan Army finishing third, the highest they could have finished was fourth.

2009 was to be Druk Star's most successful season to date, which saw the club win both the A-Division title for the second time in their history as well as the 2009 Club Cup Championship. Druk Star dominated the league competition completely, going the whole season unbeaten, including sizeable victories over Rigzhung 13–0 and 11–0, and Druk Athletic 13–1. The only time they dropped points throughout the whole season was in draws with Choden, Drukpol and Transport United scoring a total of 72 goals and conceding only 12 in their 13 matches. In The Club Cup Championship, Druk Star beat B-Division club Motithang College 9–1 in the quarter-finals, before defeating Drukpol 5–4 on penalties, following a 1–1 draw in normal time in the semi-finals. The final took place on September 26 and Druk Stars beat Yeedzin 1–0 to claim their first cup victory and their first league and cup double. In winning the A-Division, they were awarded Bhutan's berth in the 2010 AFC President's Cup.

Druk Star was unable to replicate their success of the previous season in 2010, again having a mediocre season and finishing in fourth place with seven wins and a draw from their twelve matches, thirteen points ahead of Choden, but twelve points behind champions Yeedzin. This was however, the first, and to date only, season where Druk Star competed in continental football, as they were drawn in Group C of the 2010 AFC President's Cup along with Yadanabon of Myanmar and HTTU Aşgabat of Turkmenistan. They travelled to Yangon where all the group games were to be played, but ultimately had a disappointing competition losing both of their matches by heavy margins, finishing last in the group and not progressing to the knock-out rounds.

Team	Pld	W	D	L	GF	GA	GD	Pts
(Myanmar) Yadanabon	2	1	1	0	11	0	+11	4
(Turkmenistan) HTTU Aşgabat	2	1	1	0	8	0	+8	4
(Bhutan) Druk Star	2	0	0	2	0	19	−19	0

9 May 2010
16:00 UTC+6:30

HTTU Aşgabat (Turkmenistan)	8–0	(Bhutan) Druk Star
Sarkisow 20'; Amanow 40', 83'; Şamyradow 56' (pen.), 86', 89' (pen.), 90+1'; Gazakow 88'	Report

Thuwunna Stadium, Yangon
Attendance: 500
Referee: Ko Hyung Jin (South Korea)

11 May 2010
16:00 UTC+6:30

Druk Star (Bhutan)	0–11	(Myanmar) Yadanabon
	Report	Aung Kyaw Moe 4'; Paing Soe 18', 26', 28', 34'; Yan Paing 20', 33', 43'; Ye Zaw Htet Aung 24'; Aye Moe 60'; Htet Naing Win 69'

Thuwunna Stadium, Yangon
Attendance: 5,000
Referee: Ebrahim Zakareya (Bahrain)

=== 2011–2014 ===
Druk Star did not participate in the 2011 A-Division and although they were not relegated in 2010, they took part in the B-Division in 2012. This season's B-Division consisted of two parts, a group stage followed by a series of knock-out rounds. Druk Star won their group, with two wins and a draw from their three matches including a 4–1 victory over Motithang. They were victorious over Thimphu United in the semi-finals and progressed to the final. The final was held on 3 June at Changjiji Football Field, in which Druk Star defeated Druk United 5–1, with both teams being promoted to the A-Division for the following season's competition. Druk Star's reserve team were runner's up in the 2012 C-Division, losing 2–0 to Losseling.

The 2013 season was particularly difficult for Druk Star. They finished fifth and last in the A-Division, with only one win against Druk United and a draw against Dzongree to their name. Along with Druk United, they entered the relegation playoffs with the top two teams from the B-Division, Motithang and BMW. Although Druk Stars lost the first game 4–3 to Druk United, and with the remaining results unknown, it would appear that they were ultimately not relegated as they competed in the 2014 A-Division.

This time they were more successful. With four wins and five draws from their twelve games, they finished in fourth place and qualified for the first time for the National League competition. The club struggled in its first season in the national league, finishing fifth out of the six competing teams ahead only of Bhutan Clearing. They won a solitary game against eventual runners-up Ugyen Academy, with only other positive result coming in the form of a 2–2 draw with bottom club Bhutan Clearing.

== Achievements ==
- A-Division/Bhutan Super League
  - Winners: 2001, 2009, 2019
- Bhutan B-Division
  - Winners: 2012
- Bhutanese Club Cup Championship
  - Winners: 2009

== Continental record ==
- AFC President's Cup

2010: Group stage
