= Choden FC =

Bhutanese football club

Choden
- Full name: Choden Football Club
- Ground: Changlimithang; Thimphu, Bhutan
- Capacity: 15,000
- League: Bhutan A-Division
- 2011: 5th

Choden Football Club was a football club from Bhutan, based at Changlimithang, consisting of players from the U-19 Bhutan national team, who played in the Bhutan A-Division, then the top level of football in Bhutan, but since replaced by a full national league. They finished fifth in the 2011 season, the last season where the A-Division was the top flight. Although they were not formally relegated at the end of the 2011 season, they do not appear to have taken part either in the 2012 A-Division, nor consequently the 2012–13 Bhutan National League.

== History ==
The first recorded mention of Choden competing in Bhutanese football is in 2005 when they won the final of the B-Division beating Rookies F.C. 3–0. The bottom two teams in the A-Division, Rigzung Club and Dzongree, for that season played off against Choden and Rookies to determine which two would play top-flight football the following season. No results are known, but from the available data from 2006, it appears that Choden were promoted from this, whilst Dzongree were relegated.

Choden's first appearance in the A-Division was in 2006, although their final position is not known as only a few results are known together with a very fragmentary final table. Choden's only known result for that season was a 1–0 victory against Druk Pol.

They were not relegated however, as they competed in the following season, where they finished sixth out of eight teams narrowly avoiding relegation. Again, details for this season are patchy at best. The only recorded results for Choden are a 1–1 draw with Yeedzin and a 4–0 loss to eventual champions Transport United. Their final points tally is also not known, as there is nor record of their score in their final game against Druk Pol. However, the maximum it could have been is 20 as they were on 17 points going into that game.

Their final position in the next season is unknown, although the highest they could have finished was fourth as the top three finishers, Yeedzin, Transport United and Royal Bhutan Army are known. However, at the halfway stage in the season, they were in sixth place, above Druk Athletic on goal difference with six points, having won two of their seven games to that point. The only two known results for Choden in 2008 were 1–1 draws with Druk Pol and Yeedzin. They could conceivably have finished bottom in the previous season, but since no clubs were promoted or relegated, they were guaranteed top-flight football in the 2009 season.

Choden recorded their best ever performance in 2009, finishing fourth, winning six and drawing four of their thirteen matches (an odd number of games was played as Royal Bhutan Army withdrew halfway through the season, in fact Choden did not play the army team at all, their first match against them being awarded to Choden 2–0 following the army's withdrawal). This strong performance included an 11–0 victory over Druk Athletic and a 5–0 win against Rigzung. Choden also performed strongly in the cup competition, as they reached the semi-finals of the 2009 Club Cup Championship, losing 4–1 to Yeedzin.

In both the 2010 and 2011 seasons, their final seasons of recorded competition, they finished in fifth place. In 2010, they finished well off the pace, recording victories only against the bottom club Nangpa 2–1 and 4–2 and Druk Athletic 4–3. With only nine points for the whole season, they finished thirteen points behind fourth placed Druk Star, and having suffered a number of heavy defeats, including an 8–0 loss to Druk Pol and a 6–0 defeat against Yeedzin, they finished with a −22 goal difference.

No details other than their final position are known for 2011. Again, they finished above Nangpa and Druk Athletic in a truncated season that was contested as a single round-robin set of matches in anticipation of the commencement of a full national league, which was in fact delayed by a further year. This was their last season of competition to date at the highest level of competition in Bhutan. They did not compete in the A-Division in 2012. It is unclear from the scant details available whether they played at a lower level that season, but an under-16 team competed the following year in the B-Division and an under-18 team rejoined the A-Division for the 2014 season, who could be considered successors to Choden, although they have not competed under that name.

== Achievements ==
- Bhutanese B-Division
  - Champions (1): 2005
