= Hemlal Bhattrai =

Bhutanese professional footballer

Personal information
- Full name: Hemlal Bhattrai
- Date of birth: 1 November 1993 (age 32)
- Place of birth: Thimphu, Bhutan
- Position: Goalkeeper

Team information
- Current team: Thimphu City

Senior career*
Years	Team	Apps	(Gls)
2012–	Thimphu City		

International career
2013–	Bhutan	2	(0)
- * Club domestic league appearances and goals

Hemlal Bhattrai is a Bhutanese professional footballer who plays for Thimphu City in the Bhutan A-Division. He made his first appearance for the Bhutan national football team in 2013.

== Playing career ==
=== Club ===
Bhattrai has played his whole career to date for Thimphu City, finishing runner-up in the A-Division in 2012, 2013 and 2014. In each of the three seasons that Bhattrai has been playing for Thimpu City, they have qualified for the Bhutan National League competition, but have yet to finish higher than mid table.

=== International ===
Bhattrai first international cap received his first international cap for Bhutan the 2–8 loss to the Maldives in the 2013 SAFF Championship. He came on as a substitute in the game against the Maldives after Leki Dukpa was sent off for fouling a Maldivian player outside of his box. His debut was a match to forget as his first action was to pick the ball out of the back of the net, the Maldives having equalised from the resulting free kick, and he would then go on to concede a further six goals in the second half. Dukpa was suspended for the next game and Bhattrai took his place, conceding a further five goals against Sri Lanka.
