= Druk Athletic FC =

Bhutanese football club

Druk Athletic
- Full name: Druk Athletic Football Club
- Ground: Changlimithang; Thimphu, Bhutan
- Capacity: 15,000
- League: Bhutan A-Division
- 2011: 6th

Druk Athletic Football Club (also known as Veterans) was a football club from Thimphu, Bhutan, that competed in the A-Division, the highest level of football in Bhutan. They originally competed in the second tier of football, but eventually won promotion to the A-Division, there they remained for a number of seasons, although they almost perennially struggled against relegation, before finally succumbing in 2011.

== History ==
=== 2002–2007 ===
The first recorded mention of Druk Athletic competing in any level of football in Bhutan was in 2002, when they competed in the B-Division. In the single round-robin group stage they performed disappointingly, winning only one of their games, a 6–0 victory over eventual last place finishers, RC Cables, and did not progress to the knock out stage. The following season was more successful, though sources are confusing. The team lost to RIHS in the knock-out final of the B-Division, but apparently were declared champions and were promoted to the A-Division for the first time.

Insufficient details is present in the surviving records for the 2004 season to show how Druk Athletic performed, though it is known they did not compete the following year, but again, a lack of detail on that season's B-Division means it is not possible to say whether they were relegated in 2004 or simply did not compete. All that can be said is that if they did play in the 2005 B-Division, they did not finish in the top two, as the final was contested by Choden and Rookies.

The next record of the club competing is in 2007. They finished in the top two of the B-Division and entered the promotion / relegation play-offs together with Wolfland from the B-Division and the bottom two teams in that year's A-Division, RIHS and Rigzung. Veterans won all three of their matches and were promoted to the A-Division for the second time in their history.

=== 2008–2012 ===
For their second period in the A-Division, they changed their name from Veterans to Druk Athletic. the team struggled in 2008. Although their final position is not known, they were in second last position at the halfway stage of the season with only two wins from their seven games to that point. Results are incomplete in the records for the remainder of the season, but it is recorded that they suffered heavy defeats, 11–1 against Transport United and 12–0 versus Yeedzin.

Their struggles continued in 2009 when they were saved from relegation only by the withdrawal of Royal Bhutan Army halfway through the season, who at that point had already gained more than twice the number of points Druk Athletic would amass throughout the whole campaign. Their sole victory came against Rigzung, 3–1, who finished below them, and their only other point was gained in a 2–2 draw versus Transport United. In their thirteen games, they conceded 113 goals and finished the season with a −101 goal difference, ending up on the receiving end of very heavy defeats at the hands of Yeedzin, 20–0 and 16–1, Druk Star, 13–1, Choden, 11–0 and Druk Pol 10–0.

The following season saw a slight improvement in their fortunes. They finished a place lower than 2009 in second last place, although this time all teams completed their twelve matches. They managed to gain two wins, 2–1 against Choden and 3–2 versus Nangpa. they also managed to perform much better defensively, still finishing with the worst goal difference in the league of −41, but only conceding 52 goals in their 12 games.

Despite finishing in second last place, there appears to have been no promotion or relegation between the A and B-Divisions, and Druk Athletic competed again in the top flight of Bhutanese football in the 2011 season. No details are available in terms of results, but it is known that Druk Athletic again finished second last with Nangpa propping up the table for a second consecutive season.

It appears that there was again no promotion or relegation, as Nangpa again took part in the A-Division in 2012, however Druk Athletic did not, and if they did compete in the B-Division then they could have finished no higher than fourth as three semi-finalists are known from that season's knock out stages. Their current status is unknown as there are no details indicating they took part in either the 2013 or 2014 B-Division competitions.

== Achievements ==
- Bhutanese B-Division
  - Champions (2): 2003, 2007
