= Druk United FC =

Association football club in Bhutan

Druk United
- Full name: Druk United Football Club
- Founded: 2002; 23 years ago 2009; 16 years ago (revived)
- Ground: Changlimithang Stadium
- Capacity: 15,000
Home colours	Away colours	Third colours

Druk United Football Club was a Bhutanese football club based in Thimphu that competed in the Bhutan Premier League, the top division of Bhutanese football. They played their home games at the Changlimithang Stadium.

== History ==
=== 2002 to 2012 ===
Druk United's first recorded instance of participating in football in the Bhutanese pyramid, was during the 2002 season, when they competed in the B-Division. With four wins and one loss from their five games in the group stage, they topped the group, finishing two points ahead of second place team, Sharks FC. The lost 1–0 to eventual runners-up Yeedzin, but won the third place playoff to finish third overall.

This third-place position was evidently enough to secure promotion to the top division of football in Bhutan for the first time. However, they finished ninth and last in the 2003 season, with only a single point. They lost 6–0 to Transport United, 6–1 to Ranjung United, 5–2 to Dzongric, 7–3 to Rigzung and 2–1 to Druk Star. Additionally they lost to Royal Bhutan Army and gained their only point either against Yeedzin or eventual winners Drukpol. They were relegated at the end of the season.

It is not known whether they competed again between 2004 and 2012, and there is no record of them competing in any future season of the A-Division for which records exist.

=== 2012 to present day ===
In 2012, they were the runners-up in the B-Division Championship, losing to Druk Star 5–1 in the final at Changjiji Football Field. However, together with Druk Star, they were promoted to the 2013 A-Division, where they finished fifth out of six, with two wins and six losses from their eight games, including a 10–2 defeat to Yeedzin. Their only victories coming from a 3–1 win over Dzongric and a 2–0 defeat of Druk Star. Together with Druk Star they competed in the relegation play-offs together with the top two teams from the B-Division for that season, Motithang and BMW. Full results for the playoffs are not known, but it is known that Druk United won the first of their matches, defeating Druk Star 4–3.

The 2014 season has been Druk United's most successful to date. Upon returning to the top flight of Bhutanese football, they won the A-Division, winning by two points from Thimphu City with nine wins and a draw from their twelve games, having come from third place at the halfway stage and made up a six-point deficit in the second half of the season. Their victory in the A-Division assured them of qualification for the National League for the first time. Their first time competing in the National League was equally successful. They finished in first place on goal difference ahead of Ugyen Academy, dropping points only in a 2–2 draw against Ugyen Academy and in losses to Drukpol, 2–1, and Thimphu City 3–0. They won all of their remaining games, including a 4–0 victory over Bhutan Clearing, despite having both Ugyen Tsheten and Nawang Dhendup sent off. By winning the league, and with the abolition of the AFC President's Cup, they became the first team from Bhutan to qualify for the AFC Cup.

== Achievements ==
- Bhutan National League

Champions: 2014

- A-Division

Champions: 2014

== Continental record ==
All results (home and away) list Druk United's goal tally first.

Season	Competition	Round	Club	Home	Away	Aggregate
2016	AFC Cup	Qualifying round	(Pakistan) K-Electric	3–3		
2016	AFC Cup	Qualifying round	(Mongolia) Khoromkhon	0–0		
