= Hari Gurung =

Bhutanese former footballer (born 1992)

Personal information
- Full name: Hari Gurung
- Date of birth: 18 February 1992 (age 34)
- Place of birth: Thimphu
- Height: 1.72 m (5 ft 7 1/2 in)
- Position: Goalkeeper

Youth career
- 2005–2007: Yeedzin FC

Senior career*
Years	Team	Apps	(Gls)
2008–2013	Yeedzin FC		
2013–2014	Thimphu City		
2014	Ugyen Academy		
2015	Thimphu		
2016	Terton		
2017–2023	Transport United		
2023	Druk Lhayul		
2023–2024	Transport United		
2024	Paro		

International career
2009–2024	Bhutan	30	(0)
- * Club domestic league appearances and goals

Hari Gurung (born 18 February 1992) is a Bhutanese former professional footballer who played as a goalkeeper. He is popularly known as the Great Wall of Bhutan.
