= Dzongree FC =

Bhutanese football club

Dzongree
- Full name: Dzongree Football Club
- Short name: DFC
- Founded: 1992; 34 years ago
- Ground: Changlimithang Stadium
- Capacity: 15,000
- Owner: Garab Wangchuk
- League: Thimphu District League
Home colours	Away colours	Third colours

Dzongree Football Club is a professional football club from Thimphu, Bhutan. Founded in 1992, they finished as the runners-up of the A-Division in 2003, but have spent most of their history either in mid-table in the A-Division or playing in the B-Division.

== History ==
The club was formed in 1992. Since 1996 it has existed as Thimphu 11 FC, In 1999 due to financial constraints, it was taken over by Football enthusiasts and changed the club name to Dzongric Football Club and participated in Thimphu League A division from year 2000 onwards. The club featured in three Divisions A, B, and C and the A division club were runners up in 2001 and 2002 and ultimately clinching the championship winners in 2003 by both the A and B division club of Dzongric. In 2004 season Dzongric Fc had two teams in the A division, which put a tremendous financial pressure to run the club and in 2005 season, the club was handed over to be managed by certain young football lovers who ran both the Teams simultaneously and changed the club name to Dzongree. Winners photo proof can be available to be uploaded. The first recorded instance of Dzongree participating in the A-Division was in 2003, where they finished as runners-up to eventual winners Druk Pol, who finished the season unbeaten. The only known result for Dzongric for this season is a 5–2 victory over Druk United.

Their next recorded involvement, since only the top four teams for 2004 are known, in the A-Division was in 2005, where they finished bottom. During this season, they won only two games and lost all the remaining fixtures out of the total of 12 played. Sources indicate that Dzongree and the team who finished second from bottom, Rigzung Club, entered into a relegation play-off with the top two teams from that season's B-Division, who were Choden and Rookies F.C. However details of any matches that took place are not available.

Details for the 2006 season are very scant, so it is not possible to say whether Dzongree survived the relegation playoff the previous season, however, they definitely did not compete in the A-Division in 2007, nor were they involved in the promotion / relegation playoffs at the end of the season from the B-Division. In fact available sources indicate that they do not appear to have competed again in the A-Division at least until 2012. This season was mediocre as far as Dzongree were concerned, winning only three of their ten games and losing all of the others, where they finished fourth and failed to qualify for the inaugural Bhutan National League.

The following season saw a slight improvement. Despite only winning three games and drawing one of their eight matches in the A-Division, their performance was sufficient to see them into third place out of five teams and to qualify for the National League for the first time. However, they struggled in the National League winning only two and drawing one of their ten games and finishing second to last in fifth place, only Phuentsholing below them. It was during this season that Dzongree signed a foreign player to play for their team. The Nigerian, Chichi, joined the club on an exchange program with a Nigerian football academy, a rarity within Bhutanese football, particularly given the stringent Bhutanese immigration laws that meant obtaining a visa for any foreign player was very difficult. Chichi scored in every game in which he played and was said to have been instrumental in securing National League football for Dzongree.

2014 was also a disappointing season for the club, which saw them miss out on National League qualification, the team finishing fifth out of seven teams. They won only three games, drawing another three along the way and scored only twelve goals in all ten matches, the lowest total out of all the competing teams.

== Achievements ==
- Bhutanese A-Division
  - Runners-up (1): 2003
