= Royal Bhutan Army FC =

Bhutanese football club

Royal Bhutan Army
- Full name: Royal Bhutan Army Football Club
- Founded: 1975; 51 years ago
- Ground: Changlimithang Stadium
- Capacity: 45,000
- League: Bhutan A-Division
- 2009: 8th (withdrew)

Royal Bhutan Army Football Club is a Bhutanese professional football club based in Thimphu, that competed in the A Division. Founded in 1975, they won the inaugural season of top-flight football in Bhutan and competed regularly in the A-Division between 2002 and 2009 when they withdrew halfway through the season. They were, as the name suggests, the football team of the Royal Bhutan Army, which later joined Tensung FC.

== History ==
=== 1975–2006 ===
Royal Bhutan Army competed in the very first recorded football competition in Bhutan was Jigme Dorji Wangchuck Memorial Gold Cup in 1975. In 1986, they winning the title following an unbeaten season where they were victorious over all nine of the other teams in the league in the single round-robin series of matches.

The next recorded instance of Royal Bhutan Army competing in any form of football competition is in 2002. They competed in the A-Division, though their final position is not known. Indeed, the only known result for them for the season is a draw against Paro. the following season saw them finish in fourth place in the A-Division, winning three and drawing four of their eight games in the single round-robin tournament. Again, only a single result is known for them, a victory over Druk Athletic.

2004 records are too fragmentary to say whether the club participated in the A-Division that season, but they did compete in 2005, when they had a poor season, finishing fifth out of seven teams with only three wins and two draws from their twelve games, narrowly avoiding the relegation playoffs to ensure another season in the top flight. They performed better in the Knock-out Championship for A-Division clubs, reaching the semi-finals, before losing 4–1 on penalties to Druk Star following a 1–1 draw in normal time.

The club improved their performance in the league markedly the next season, finishing in third place, ahead of Druk Pol, but behind champions Transport United and an unknown second-place finisher. this is yet another season where fragmentary records mean that there is only one known result for the club, a 0–0 draw with Druk Pol.

=== 2006–2009 ===
The army finished in fifth place in 2007, eleven points behind champions Transport United after the fourteen-game season. Only three results are known for this season: a 1–0 loss to Druk Pol, a 2–0 victory over Yeedzin and a 6–0 thrashing of eventual bottom place finishers Rigzung.

2008 saw arguably Royal Bhutan Army's best performance since they won the national title in 1986. They finished third in the league behind Yeedzin and Transport United, with nine wins and a draw from their fourteen games (including a 5–2 win over Druk Pol and a loss to Yeedzin). As well as this, they reached the final of the Thimpu Football Knock-out Tournament, beating Transport United 6–3 in the quarter-final and Druk Star 4–1 in the semi-final, only to lose to Yeedzin 4–3 in the final at the Changjiji Ground on 28 September.

The following season however, was to be the club's last to date in the A-Division. After seven games, with one win and a draw, they withdrew from the competition. Their remaining game in the first half of the season against Choden was awarded to their opposition and the team were relegated.

== Achievements ==
- A-Division: 1-time winners

1986

- Thimpu Football Knock-out Tournament: 1 time runners-up

2008
