= Drukpol FC =

Bhutanese football club

Drukpol
- Full name: Drukpol Football Club
- Founded: 1986; 40 years ago (as Royal Bhutan Police)
- Ground: Changlimithang Stadium
- Capacity: 15,000
Home colours	Away colours

Drukpol Football Club, sometimes referred to as Druk Pol, was a football club from Thimphu, Bhutan. Founded in 1986, the team was called Royal Bhutan Police FC until 1996. Drukpol FC won the A-Division championship a record eight times, more than any other team in Bhutan. The team's home ground was Changlimithang Stadium.

== History ==
=== 1980s and 1990s ===
Drukpol took part in the first recorded season of league football in Bhutan in 1986, playing under the name Royal Bhutan Police. The league was played on a single round-robin basis and Drukpol finished fourth with four wins and two draws from their nine games.

There are no recorded results for any form of competition in Bhutan between 1987 and 1995, so it is not known whether Drukpol competed at all during that period. However, records indicate that they won the national championship in 1996, though no results exist to provide any further detail, and their championship win should not be confused with the victory by Bhutan Telecom Company IECH FC, who won the eighth Thimphu Championship in the same year.

Drukpol won the next three titles, becoming the first team recorded in Bhutan to have won three and four titles in a row, and the only team to date to win five titles in a row, although no further details exist regarding these seasons.

=== 2001 to 2005 ===
2001 marked the formal start of the A-Division. Drukpol competed in the Thimphu National League, a competition consisting of teams from both Thimphu and Phuentsholing. No details exist relating to this competition, but it is known that it was a qualifying tournament for the A-Division and that Drukpol, along with Thimphu and Paro qualified. Drukpol competed in Group A, and qualified for the semi-final stage by beating Paro and drawing with Thimphu. However, in the semi-final, they lost 1–0 to Druk Star, with Dorji scoring in the 21st minute. They then lost in the third place match to Thimphu 4–0, with goals from Sonam Jamtsho, Ugyen Dorji, Deo Kumar and Kinlay Dorji. Druk Star won the championship.

Drukpol returned to form in the following season, winning the A-Division for the first time, but their sixth overall national title. the only known results from this season for Drukpol are a 5–0 win over RSTA and a 5–1 loss to Thimphu.

A second consecutive title followed in 2003, as Drukpol went unbeaten throughout the season, winning six and drawing two of their eight games. However, despite there dominance of Bhutanese football in the last decade, this would be the team's last title for nearly ten years.

Details are scant for the 2004 season, though it's known that Transport United won the A-Division. It is not known where in the league Drukpol finished, but as some form of consolation, the team did win the A-Division knock-out competition, beating Yeedzin in the final.

Drukpol were again beaten to the title by Transport United the next season, this time by a point. They led the league at the halfway stage having won five of their six games, but losing 0–1 to Transport United, but Transport United overtook them on the final day of the season, beating Yeedzin 2–1 to claim the title. Drukpol were able to defend their A-Division knock-out competition title though, beating Yeedzin 3–1 on penalties following a draw in normal time and then beating Druk Star 5–3 in the final on September 8 with goals from Ugyen Tsheten, Passang Dorji and a hat-trick from Wangyal Dorji.

=== 2006 to 2010 ===
2006 saw a dip in form for Drukpol as they could only finish fourth in the A-Division behind Transport United, who won their third consecutive title, and Royal Bhutan Army who finished third. It is not known who finished second, nor whether Drukpol were able to defen their knock-out competition title.

The following season saw a fourth consecutive title for Transport United, with Drukpol again beaten into second place. Drukpol's final points total is not known, but it is known that they and Transport United were both on 28 points going into the last game of the season, with Transport United ahead on goal difference. However, a 20–0 victory over RIHS on the final day with Passang Tshering scoring seventeen goals in that game confirmed Drukpol's position in second place, missing out again on a place in the AFC President's Cup.

Drukpol's performance slipped in the 2008 season. their final position is not known, although it is known that they did not finish in the top three, and had sat in fifth place at the halfway point of the season, with three wins and a draw from their seven games.

2009 was an improvement on previous season, as Drukpol finished in third place behind Druk Star, who won their second ever national title, and Yeedzin, They achieved impressive victories against Druk Athletic 10–1 and 8–1 as well as 9–0 and 6–0 wins over Rigzung Club. However, they also drew five of their thirteen games, finishing ten points behind Druk Star. They also reached the semi-finals of the Club Cup Championship, losing 4–5 on penalties to eventual winners Druk Star after a 1–1 draw in normal time.

The following season saw a further improvement in performance by Drukpol, as they managed to improve on their third-place finish the previous year by finishing in runner's-up place, admittedly nine points behind Yeedzin, who went through the whole competition unbeaten. A 4–2 victory over Transport United on the final day of the season, put them above Transport on goal difference, with both teams recording eight victories and a draw from their twelve games.

=== 2011 to 2017 ===
2011 was the final season that the A-Division was the top level of competition in Bhutan. Drukpol slipped to third place in this year's competition behind winners Yeedzin and Zimdra in second place, though this season's competition was only played one a single round robin basis in anticipation of the new National League commencing, an event that was ultimately delayed to the following year.

During the 2012 season, Drukpol, having not won the A-Division for the past eight seasons and finishing second or third on several occasions, finally won another title. In their ten games they won eight of them and drew one, scoring an average of five goals a game, including a 19–0 victory over Nangpa. However, they missed out on the opportunity to represent Bhutan in the 2013 AFC President's Cup due to the advent of the new National League, winning only six of their ten games in that competition and as a result finished as the runners-up in the inaugural contest, lost out to Yeedzin.

Drukpol were exempted from the 2013 A-Division since, being the Royal Bhutan Police team, they were required for the Bhutan elections that took place that year. They were meant to contest the play-off match against Dzongree for a promotion to the National League, but it appears that this play-off never took place, as both teams featured in the National League. Drukpol finished fourth out of six teams, winning only two games, whilst drawing five.

They qualified for the 2014 Bhutan National League by finishing third in the A-Division, behind Druk United and Thimpu City. In the National League they finished in fourth place, again behind champions Druk United and Thimphu City in addition to Ugyen Academy.

In July 2017, the team was suspended from all competitions by the Bhutan Football Federation for mishandling and disobeying the referee during a match. Therefore, the club decided to merge its staff and players with Tensung FC of the Royal Bhutan Army.

== Achievements ==
- Bhutan A-Division
  - Champions (8): 1996, 1997, 1998, 1999, 2000, 2002, 2003, 2012
  - Runners-up (3): 2005, 2007, 2010
