= Rigzhung FC =

Bhutanese football club

Rigzhung
- Full name: Rigzhung Football Club
- Ground: Changlimithang; Thimphu, Bhutan
- League: B-Division

Rigzhung Football Club was a football club from Thimphu, Bhutan, based at Changlimithang. Having won the B-Division in 2002, they spent a number of seasons struggling in the A-Division and regularly finished bottom or second from bottom only to gain a reprieve whether through relegation playoffs or because there was no relegation that season. After several years, they were finally sent down to the B-Division, where they were last recorded playing in 2013.

== History ==
Rigzhung were promoted from the B-Division following the 2002 season, when they won the league, going unbeaten throughout the whole season. Drawn in group 1 for the group stage, they won four and drew one of their games in this single round-robin stage, a point ahead of Yeedzin Their +22 goal difference was aided by a 6–0 win over RC Cables and an 11 victory against Veterans FC. they defeated Sharks FC 6–2 in the semi-final of the knock-out stage and then beat Yeedzin 5–3 on penalties after a 1–1 draw following extra time, and were promoted to the A-Division for the following season.

In their first season in the A-Division, they finished second from bottom, finishing only above Druk United. Details for this season are scant, but it is known that as well as drawing two of their games, their solitary victory in the season was a 7–3 win against Druk United.

No details exist to indicate how Rigzhung performed in the 2004 season, but the next season for which full records are available show they again finished in penultimate place in the relegation zone. They entered the relegation playoffs with Dzongree from the A-Division and Choden and another unknown team from the B-Division. there is little in the way of information about these matches, but Rigzhung must have been successful as they competed again in the A-Division the following season, although their only known result was a 9–0 loss to Transport United.

In the 2007 season, Rigzhung finished bottom of the A-Division, winning just a single game from their fourteen matches and losing all the rest. they again entered the relegation playoffs, this time with RIHS against the top two teams from the B-Division: Veterans and Wolfland. They won 2 and lost one of their games (to Veterans), doing enough to secure another season in the A-Division.

The following season saw them bottom of the league with no points at all at the halfway stage of the competition, having lost all seven of their games by that stage, although none of their results are known. Their second half performance was ultimately moot, as no teams were relegated or promoted in the A-Division at the end of the season.

In 2009, they were saved from last place as Royal Bhutan Army withdrew halfway through the season (having already amassed more than three times the points that Rigzhung did all season by that stage), though this time they were relegated, without going through any playoffs. Rigzhung suffered some heavy defeats that season, losing 13–0 and 11–0 to eventual champions Druk Stars and 10–2 and 9–2 to Yeedzin. The next time records show the performance of Rigzhung, they were playing in the B-Division again in 2012 and 2013.

== Achievements ==
- Bhutanese B-Division
  - Champions (1): 2002
