= Chencho =

Chencho may refer to:

- Chencho Corleone, member of the Puerto Rican reggaeton duo Plan B
- Chencho Gyeltshen (born 1996), Bhutanese footballer
- Chencho Nio, Bhutanese footballer
- El Chencho, Anthony Atencio
