= Tshering Wangdi =

Bhutanese footballer

Personal information
- Full name: Tshering Wangdi
- Place of birth: Phuentsholing, Bhutan
- Height: 1.75 m (5 ft 9 in)
- Position: Midfielder

Senior career*
Years	Team	Apps	(Gls)
2008–2011	Transport United		
2011–2014	Yeedzin		

International career
2011–2014	Bhutan		
- * Club domestic league appearances and goals

Tshering Wangdi is a Bhutanese former footballer who last played for Yeedzin. He made his first appearance for the Bhutan national football team in 2011.
