= RSTA FC =

Football club in Bhutan

RSTA
- Full name: RSTA Football Club
- Ground: Changlimithang; Thimphu, Bhutan
- Capacity: 15,000
- League: Bhutan A-Division
- 2002: Unknown

RSTA Football Club was a football club from Bhutan, based at Changlimithang, who played in the Bhutan A-Division, then the top level of football in Bhutan, but since replaced by a full national league.

== History ==
It is known that RSTA participated in the 2002, although their final position is not known. The only known result involving RSTA is a 5–0 loss to Druk Pol.
