= Pema Chophel =

Bhutanese footballer

Personal information
- Full name: Pema Chophel
- Date of birth: 6 August 1981 (age 45)
- Place of birth: Bhutan
- Position: Midfielder

Team information
- Current team: Yeedzin

Senior career*
Years	Team	Apps	(Gls)
2005	Transport United		
2006–2012	Yeedzin		

International career
2003–2008	Bhutan	11	(1)
- * Club domestic league appearances and goals

Pema Chophel (born 6 August 1981) is a Bhutanese former footballer, who played for Yeedzin. He made his first appearance for the Bhutan national football team in 2003.

== Career statistics ==
=== International ===
Appearances and goals by national team and year
National team	Year	Apps	Goals
Bhutan	2003	9	1
Bhutan	2004	–	
Bhutan	2005	1	0
Bhutan	2006	–	
Bhutan	2007	–	
Bhutan	2008	1	0
Total		11	1

Scores and results list Bhutan's goal tally first, score column indicates score after each Chophel goal.

List of international goals scored by Pema Chophel
No.	Date	Venue	Opponent	Score	Result	Competition
1	23 April 2003	Changlimithang Stadium, Thimphu, Bhutan	Guam	5–0	6–0	2004 AFC Asian Cup qualification
