= Yeedzin FC =

Association football club in Bhutan

Yeedzin
- Full name: Yeedzin Football Club
- Founded: 2002; 23 years ago
- Dissolved: 2016; 9 years ago
- Ground: Changlimithang Stadium
- Capacity: 15,000
Home colours	Away colours

Yeedzin Football Club was a football club from Thimphu, Bhutan. Founded in 2002, they were promoted from the B-Division to the A-Division in the same year. They won their first A-Division title in 2008 and have won a total of four A-Division championships. They also qualified for the National League in 2012 and 2013, winning the inaugural national competition in 2012. They have been Bhutan's representative in the AFC President's Cup on four occasions, and lost all of their twelve games played in the competition with a goal difference of –75.

== History ==
=== 2002–2008 ===
Yeedzin were founded in 2002 by Jigme Norbu and participated in the 2002 B-Division. During the group stage, they won four out of their five matches, losing only to Rigzung Club who finished one point above them. In addition to Druk United and Sharks, who qualified from the other group, they progressed to the semi-finals. They beat Druk United 1–0 but lost 5–3 on penalties after extra time in the final following a 1–1 draw in regular time with Rigzung. However, both finalists were promoted to the A-Division for the following season. Yeedzin's first recorded appearance in competition was in the 2003 season where they finished in sixth place out of ten teams. Few results are recorded for this season and none for Yeedzin, but is known that they either won three, drew one and lost four of their eight games or won two, drew four and lost two. It is not known where they finished in the league the following season, although it is certain that they did not finish in the top four of the 2004 A-Division. However, there was a knockout competition for all the clubs in the A-Division in which Yeedzin were runners-up, losing to Drukpol in the final.

In 2005, Yeedzin achieved their best finish to date, finishing in third place, a point behind the winners Transport United and behind on goal difference to Drukpol, 14 points ahead of fourth-place finishers Druk Star. They topped the table after four of the twelve matches, with three wins and a draw, including a 4–0 victory over Transport United. However, by halfway, they had slipped to second place, two points behind Drukpol, but still ahead of Transport United on goal difference. The league went to the final game of the season, and Yeedzin were beaten to the title, losing 2–1 away to Transport United. They also lost 3–1 on penalties to Drukpol in the A-Division Knock-Out Championship. Details are scant for the next season, it is only known that they did not finish in either first, third or fourth place, beating RIHS in the process 4–1. Slightly more data is available for the 2007 season, Yeedzin finished in fourth place on 23 points, ahead of Royal Bhutan Army, but behind champions Transport United, Drukpol and Druk Star in a season that included a 15–0 victory over RIHS when the opposition fielded only nine players. The following season Yeedzin produced their best performance to date winning both the league and cup. They finished the league season unbeaten, four points ahead of runners-up Transport United, dropping points in only two games, including a 1–1 draw with Choden FC, the Bhutan U-19 team whilst also beating Rigzung 20–0 in the second half of the season. They won the 2008 A-Division Knock-Out Tournament, beating Royal Bhutan Army 4–3 in the final.

=== 2009 ===
However, despite scoring more goals than any other team and more than the bottom half of the table managed combined and with scorelines of 10–2, 20–0 and 16–1 against Rigzung and Druk Athletic twice respectively, they were unable to retain their league title in the 2009 season, losing three games throughout the course of the season and finishing five points behind Druk Star, who ended the season unbeaten. They were equally unfortunate in the Club Cup Championship. Despite beating Nangpa 12–0 in the quarter-finals and Choden 4–1 in the semi-finals, they lost 1–0 to Druk Star in the final as the mirrored what Yeedzin had achieved the previous season.

2009 was also the first season that Yeedzin represented Bhutan in continental competition, their victory in the previous season's league competition meaning that they were awarded Bhutan's berth in the 2009 AFC President's Cup. They were drawn in Group C for the Group Stage, along with Dordoi-Dynamo Naryn of Kyrgyzstan, Kanbawza of Burma and Phnom Penh Crown of Cambodia. They travelled to Bishkek, where all the group games were played, but were beaten in all three games, conceding fourteen goals and scoring only three through Pema Chophel, Jigme Tenzin and Tschedupla, and did not progress.

Pos	Team	Pld	W	D	L	GF	GA	GD	Pts
1	(Kyrgyzstan) Dordoi-Dynamo Naryn	3	3	0	0	12	2	+10	9
2	(Myanmar) Kanbawza	3	2	0	1	9	7	+2	6
3	(Cambodia) Phnom Penh Crown	3	1	0	2	7	8	−1	3
4	(Bhutan) Yeedzin FC	3	0	0	3	3	14	−11	0

10 June 2009
18:00

Dordoi-Dynamo Naryn (Kyrgyzstan)	7–0	(Bhutan) Yeedzin FC
Murzaev 2', 15' (pen.), 65', 79'; Tetteh 29', 87'; Mulajanov 46'	Report

Spartak Stadium, Kyrgyzstan
Attendance: 7,500
Referee: Vladislav Tseytlin (Uzbekistan)

12 June 2009
14:30

Yeedzin FC (Bhutan)	2–4	(Myanmar) Kanbawza
Chophel 10'; Tenzin 31'	Report	Rinchen 38' (o.g.); Soe Min Oo 38', 81'; Win Min Htut 78'

Spartak Stadium, Kyrgyzstan
Attendance: 150
Referee: Kakabaý Seýidow (Turkmenistan)

14 June 2009
16:30

Phnom Penh Crown (Cambodia)	3–1	(Bhutan) Yeedzin FC
Lappé-Lappé 22', 63'; Rithy 43'	Report	Tschedupla 40'

Spartak Stadium, Kyrgyzstan
Attendance: 300
Referee: Vladislav Tseytlin (Uzbekistan)

=== 2010–11 ===
Yeedzin bounced straight back the following season with another unbeaten season, finishing nine points clear of Drukpol to win their second championship, dropping points only once; in a 0–0 draw against Drukpol. In winning the title, they were awarded Bhutan's place in the 2011 AFC President's Cup.

Details for the 2011 season are again minimal, although it is known that Yeedzin continued their domestic success, winning a second consecutive title and third overall, in an abridged season where they A-Division was contested only as a single round-robin set of matches in anticipation of the commencement of a new national league competition that was ultimately cancelled. They also competed in the 2011 AFC President's Cup and were drawn in Group B for the group stage along with Istiqlol from Tajikistan, Yadanarbon from Myanmar and Jabal Al Mukaber from Palestine. They travelled to Yangon in Myanmar, where all the group games were played. In a repeat of their 2009 campaign, they were again beaten in all three games, this time without managing to score a single goal and again, did not progress to the next round.

Pos	Team	Pld	W	D	L	GF	GA	GD	Pts	Qualification
1	(Tajikistan) Istiqlol	3	2	1	0	11	1	+10	7	Advanced to Final stage
2	(Myanmar) Yadanarbon	3	2	1	0	11	4	+7	7	Advanced to Final stage
3	(Palestine) Jabal Al Mukaber	3	1	0	2	10	6	+4	3	
4	(Bhutan) Yeedzin	3	0	0	3	0	21	−21	0	

13 May 2011
15:30

Yadanarbon (Myanmar)	6–0	(Bhutan) Yeedzin
Yan Paing 4', 50'; Pai Soe 11', 15', 36'; Koné 40'	Report

Thuwunna Stadium, Yangon
Attendance: 4,000
Referee: Dmitriy Mashentsev (Kyrgyzstan)

15 May 2011
15:30

Yeedzin (Bhutan)	0–8	(Tajikistan) Istiqlol
	Report	Fatkhuloev 16', 30'; Vasiev 24'; Tokhirov 56', 63', 70', 76'; Saburov 90+2'

Thuwunna Stadium, Yangon
Attendance: 1,200
Referee: Hettikamkanamge Perera (Sri Lanka)

17 May 2011
15:30

Jabal Al Mukaber (Palestine)	7–0	(Bhutan) Yeedzin
A. Aliwisat 2'; Halman 9'; S. Aliwisat 14'; Al Amour 33', 44'; Khatib 64'; Wadi 80'	Report

Bogyoke Aung San Stadium, Yangon
Attendance: 200
Referee: Dmitriy Mashentsev (Kyrgyzstan)

=== 2012 ===
The next season started off in a disappointing fashion. Despite two heavy defeats of Nangpa (12–0 and 16–0), Yeedzin were beaten twice by Drukpol and drew twice with Zimdra (now known as Thimphu City FC) to finish behind these two sides in third place, with Drukpol taking the A-Division title. However, this was sufficient for qualification to the inaugural Bhutan National League. This new league was a genuine national competition, whereas previously the A-Division had nominally been termed the National League between 2001 and 2003, it was in practice a league for teams based in Thimphu. Yeedzin qualified along with Drukpol and Zimdra and were joined by Phuentsholing, representing Chukha District, Samtse, representing Samtse District and Ugyen Academy, representing Punakha District. A team representing Gelephug District was supposed to enter as well but apparently did not. Yeedzin performed strongly in the competition, finishing the league after ten games unbeaten, whilst conceding only five goals. They won the league by beating Drukpol 2–1, coming from behind following a goal for Drukpol from Jigyel Ugyen Wangchuck to claim the 400,000 Ngultrum prize. Although they had lost their A-Division title, with this competition now merely being a qualifier for the new national league, Yeedzin had won their third consecutive national championship, the first time a team had achieved this feat since Transport United in 2006, the only other time in the history of Bhutanese football that this had happened.

In addition to their domestic success, their championship-winning performance in the prior season also meant that they received Bhutan's place in the 2012 AFC President's Cup, the second consecutive time they had competed in the tournament and their third overall appearance. Yeedzin were drawn in Group B for the Group stage along with Dordoi Bishkek of Kyrgyzstan, Nepal Police Club and Phnom Penh Crown from Cambodia. They travelled to Phnom Penh, where all the Group B games were to be played, but again Yeedzin's performance was disappointing, as they lost all three games for the third time and conceded 23 goals, their worst defensive performance to date and did not progress. Unlike the previous year's tournament however, they were able to score two consolation goals through Chencho Gyeltshen and Tshering Wangdi in a 11–2 loss to Dordoi Bishkek.

Team	Pld	W	D	L	GF	GA	GD	Pts
(Kyrgyzstan) Dordoi Bishkek	3	3	0	0	17	3	+14	9
(Cambodia) Phnom Penh Crown	3	2	0	1	9	1	+8	6
Nepal Police Club	3	1	0	2	5	6	−1	3
(Bhutan) Yeedzin	3	0	0	3	2	23	−21	0

5 May 2012
13:30

Phnom Penh Crown (Cambodia)	8–0	(Bhutan) Yeedzin
Sokumpheak 20'; Borey 26', 41', 66'; Sothy 54'; Suhana 61'; S. Pheng 76'; H. Pheng 85'	Report

Olympic Stadium, Phnom Penh
Attendance: 3,000
Referee: Jumpei Iida (Japan)

7 May 2012
13:30

Yeedzin (Bhutan)	2–11	(Kyrgyzstan) Dordoi Bishkek
Chencho 40'; Tshering 90+2'	Report	Murzaev 18', 27', 62', 81', 87'; Askarov 39'; Tetteh 45'; Maka Kum 59'; Anderson 64', 70'; Bekbolotov 90+1'

Olympic Stadium, Phnom Penh
Attendance: 978
Referee: Nagor Amir Noor Mohamed (Malaysia)

9 May 2012
13:30

Nepal Police Club	4–0	(Bhutan) Yeedzin
Silwal 2', 71'; Shrestha 37'; Pandey 49'	Report

Olympic Stadium, Phnom Penh
Attendance: 1,500
Referee: Jumpei Iida (Japan)

=== 2013–14 ===
Yeedzin were able to recover their A-Division title in the 2013 season, qualifying for the second National League competition in first place following an unbeaten performance, dropping points only in a 0–0 draw with eventual runners-up Thimphu City, scoring 27 goals in their eight matches, including a 10–2 victory over Druk United. They were also unbeaten in the National League as well, the first time a side had gone through both competitions without losing. Although, with five draws to their name in the national league they were only able to finish in second place behind Ugyen Academy and so missed out on Bhutan's place in the AFC President's Cup for the first time in three years. However, since they had won the previous year's National League competition, they did compete as Bhutan's entrant for the third consecutive year in the 2013 AFC President's Cup.

They were again drawn in Group B for the group stage of matches along with Dordoi Bishkek, for the second year in a row, Global from the Philippines and KRL from Pakistan. They travelled to Cebu City in the Philippines, where all the Group B matches were to be played, but for the fourth time were unable to gain any points, losing all three games and, for the second time in their for appearances, were unable to score a goal and did not progress from the group.

Team	Pld	W	D	L	GF	GA	GD	Pts
(Kyrgyzstan) Dordoi Bishkek	3	2	1	0	16	2	+14	7
(Pakistan) KRL	3	2	1	0	11	1	+10	7
(Philippines) Global	3	1	0	2	6	8	−2	3
(Bhutan) Yeedzin	3	0	0	3	0	22	−22	0

8 May 2013
19:30

Global (Philippines)	5–0	(Bhutan) Yeedzin
Reichelt 5'; De Murga 9'; Starosta 15'; Bahadoran 20'; Mw. Angeles 64'	Report

Cebu City Sports Complex, Cebu City
Attendance: 2,500
Referee: Mukhtar Al Yarimi (Yemen)

10 May 2013
16:30

Yeedzin (Bhutan)	0–9	(Kyrgyzstan) Dordoi Bishkek
	Report	Murzaev 9', 41', 50', 72', 80' (pen.); Rustamov 30', 84'; Shamshiev 54'; Kaleutin 62'

Cebu City Sports Complex, Cebu City
Attendance: 900
Referee: Mohammad Abu Loum (Jordan)

12 May 2013
16:30

KRL (Pakistan)	8–0	(Bhutan) Yeedzin
Kalim Ullah 4' (pen.), 71', 75', 83', 90+1'; Abid Khan 37'; Us-Salam 44'; Saad Ullah 45+1'	Report

Cebu City Sports Complex, Cebu City
Attendance: 1,315
Referee: Nagor Amir Noor Mohamed (Malaysia)

2014 saw the worst performance in the A-Division by Yeedzin in their history. With only three wins and two draws from their twelve matches, they finished in sixth place and failed to qualify for the National League for the first time. In addition, since they lost the National League title to Ugyen Academy the previous season, they did not participate in the final edition of the President's Cup.

== Honours ==
- Bhutan A-Division
  - Champions: 2008, 2010, 2011, 2013
  - Runners-up: 2009
- Bhutan National League
  - Champions: 2012–13

== Continental record ==
- AFC President's Cup: 4 appearances

2009: 4th in Group stage
2011: 4th in Group stage
2012: 4th in Group stage
2013: 4th in Group stage
