= 1997 Bhutan A-Division =

A-Division (Bhutan)
- Season: 1997
- Champions: Druk Pol

The 1997 season of the Bhutanese A-Division was the third recorded season of top-flight football in Bhutan. The league was won by Druk Pol, their second title in a row.
