= 1998 Bhutan A-Division =

A-Division (Bhutan)
- Season: 1998
- Champions: Druk Pol

The 1998 season of the Bhutanese A-Division was the fourth recorded season of top-flight football in Bhutan. The league was won by Druk Pol, their third title in a row and the first time a Bhutanese team had achieved a hat-trick of titles.
