= 2003 Bhutan A-Division =

A-Division (Bhutan)
- Season: 2003
- Champions: Druk Pol
- Matches played: 36
- Longest unbeaten run: 8 - Druk Pol

The 2003 season of the Bhutanese A-Division was the ninth recorded season of top-flight football in Bhutan. 10 teams competed, and the championship was won by Druk Pol, their second title in a row and seventh in the last eight seasons. It is assumed that Veterans were promoted having won the final of the B-Division.

== League standings ==
Pos	Team	Pld	W	D	L	GF	GA	GD	Pts	Qualification or relegation
1	Druk Pol (C)	8	6	2	0	0	0	0	20	
2	Dzongree	8	5	2	1	0	0	0	17	
3	Transport United	8	5	1	2	0	0	0	16	
4	Royal Bhutan Army	8	3	4	1	0	0	0	13	
5	Druk Stars	8	3	2	3	0	0	0	11	
6	Yeedzin	8	3	1	4	0	0	0	10	
7	Ranjung United	8	1	3	4	0	0	0	6	
8	Rigzhung	8	1	2	5	0	0	0	5	
9	Druk United (R)	8	0	1	7	0	0	0	1	Relegated to B-Division

Updated to match(es) played on 05 Jun 2004. Source:
Rules for classification: 1) points; 2) goal difference; 3) number of goals scored.
(C) Champions; (R) Relegated
