= Jigme Tenzin =

Bhutanese footballer

Personal information
- Full name: Jigme Tenzin
- Date of birth: 15 July 1990 (age 36)
- Place of birth: Bhutan
- Position: Defender

Team information
- Current team: Yeedzin

Senior career*
Years	Team	Apps	(Gls)
2009–	Yeedzin		

International career
2009–	Bhutan	7	(0)
- * Club domestic league appearances and goals

Jigme Tenzin is a Bhutanese professional footballer, currently playing for Yeedzin. He made his first appearance for the Bhutan national football team in 2009.
