= 2002 Bhutan A-Division =

A-Division (Bhutan)
- Season: 2002
- Champions: Druk Pol

The 2002 season of the Bhutanese A-Division was the eighth recorded season of top-flight football in Bhutan and started on 28 July 2002. The league was won by Druk Pol, their sixth title. Eleven teams took part, four from Phuentsholing and seven from Thimphu.

Rigzung won promotion from the B-Division to the A-Division.

== Known results ==
July 28

Paro	Drew	Royal Bhutan Army
Unknown	Source	Unknown

July 28

Thimphu	4–1	Transport United
Unknown	Source	Unknown

August 4

Thimphu	5–1	Druk Pol
Unknown	Source	Unknown

August 8

Druk Pol	5–0	RSTA
Unknown	Source	Unknown

August 11

Druk Stars	2–0	Paro
Unknown	Source	Unknown

August 15

Druk Stars	5–0	RBP
Unknown	Source	Unknown
