= Centenary and Coronation Park =

Coordinates: 27.47106°N 89.64260°E

In 2005, King Jigme Singye Wangchuck stepped down from the throne to make way for his Son Jigme Khesar Namgyal Wangchuck to lead the kingdom of Bhutan. The new king studied in Britain and various universities in the US. The Coronation and Centenary Park was built to honour our new king. Ashi Chimi Yangzom Wangchuck inaugurated the Centenary and Coronation Park on 26 September 2006. It is positioned in the middle of Changlimithang ground and Wangchu River. It is built on an area of 5.6 acre of land running along the banks of river Wangchu. The park was formed by footpaths made of stones, canopies and benches. There are small swings and slides, a miniature basketball court and a small sand football ground. Not only that the park is filled with gardens of more than sixty species of flower and trees. During the evening the lights are lit up by the Thimphu Power Corporation of Bhutan.

== Walking Buddha ==
A 45 feet tall statue of a Buddha walking was inaugurated on 13 April 2012 which symbolizing the celebration of the 84th Birth Anniversary of Thailand’s King and also the wedding anniversary of His Majesty the King. It is also believed to have been constructed for the people to pursue happiness. The inauguration was ended by lighting candles and reciting prayers.

== Other attractions ==
A Centenary Farmers Market located two minutes from the park is the perfect place to shop for groceries and almost any household items for a reasonable prize. There is also a national football stadium locally known as Changlimithang Stadium where it is served as a multi-propose stadium for football matches, archery matches and to celebrate exceptional occasions.
