= 2005 Bhutan A-Division =

A-Division (Bhutan)
- Season: 2005
- Champions: Transport United
- AFC Presidents Cup: Transport United
- Matches played: 42

The 2005 season of the Bhutanese A-Division was the eleventh recorded season of top-flight football in Bhutan. The league was won by Transport United, their second title in a row. As a result, they qualified as Bhutan's representatives in the 2006 AFC President's Cup.

== League table ==
Teams played each other on a home and away basis, with the bottom two teams qualifying for a relegation playoff against the top two teams from the B-Division.

Pos	Team	Pld	W	D	L	GF	GA	GD	Pts	Qualification
1	Transport United (C)	12	9	2	1	0	0	0	29	Qualified for 2006 AFC President's Cup
2	Druk Pol	12	9	1	2	0	0	0	28	
3	Yeedzin	12	9	1	2	0	0	0	28	
4	Druk Stars	12	4	2	6	0	0	0	14	
5	Royal Bhutan Army	12	3	2	7	0	0	0	11	
6	Rigzung	12	2	1	9	0	0	0	7	Qualified for relegation playoffs
7	Dzongree (R)	12	2	0	10	0	0	0	6	Qualified for relegation playoffs

Updated to match(es) played on 4 October 2006. Source:
Note: one more win than loss; odd number of draws; presumably Rigzung should have a 2-0-10 record.
Rules for classification: 1) points; 2) goal difference; 3) number of goals scored.
(C) Champions; (R) Relegated

== Relegation playoffs ==
Choden won the final of the B-Division on 19 June 2005, beating Rookies 3-0. Choden and another unknown team then entered the playoffs against Rigzhung and Dzongric. From the known fixtures that took place in 2006, it can be extrapolated that Choden beat Dzongric, whilst Rigzhung beat the other unknown team from the B-Division.
