= 2007 Bhutan A-Division =

A-Division (Bhutan)
- Season: 2007
- Champions: Transport United
- AFC President's Cup: Transport United

The 2007 season of the Bhutanese A-Division was the thirteenth recorded season of top-flight football in Bhutan. The league was won by Transport United, their fourth title in a row and only the second time a team had achieved such a feat since Druk Pol won their fourth title in a row in 1999.

== League table ==
Teams played each other on a home and away basis, with the bottom two teams qualifying for a relegation playoff against the top two teams from the B-Division.

Pos	Team	Pld	W	D	L	GF	GA	GD	Pts	Qualification
1	Transport United (C)	0	0	0	0	0	0	0	0	Qualified for 2008 AFC President's Cup
2	Druk Pol	0	0	0	0	0	0	0	0	
3	Druk Stars	0	0	0	0	0	0	0	0	
4	Yeedzin	0	0	0	0	0	0	0	0	
5	Royal Bhutan Army	0	0	0	0	0	0	0	0	
6	Choden	0	0	0	0	0	0	0	0	
7	RIHS	0	0	0	0	0	0	0	0	Qualified for relegation playoffs
8	Rigzung	14	1	0	13	0	0	0	3	Qualified for relegation playoffs

Updated to match(es) played on 11 July 2008. Source:
Note:League table for 2007 is extremely fragmentary. Only the final positions and results for RIHS FC are known.
Rules for classification: 1) points; 2) goal difference; 3) number of goals scored.
(C) Champions

=== Notable results ===
The league table for the season is incomplete and only a handful of results are known. However, there are a number of results which are notable due to their high scores, both involving very heavy defeats for the Royal Institute of Health and Sciences team:

24 July 2007?

Yeedzin	15-0	RIHS
	Source

Note: RIHS only fielded 9 players.

3 August 2007

RIHS	0-20	Transport United
	Source	Tshering x17 (seventeen goals); Dorji; Dorji; Dhendup

In the game between Transport United and RIHS FC, Passang Tshering scored seventeen goals. Sources indicate that the most goals scored by a single player in a game is 16, scored by Panagiotis Pontikos of Olympos Xylofagou against SEK Ayios Athanasios in May 2007 and by Stephane Stanis for RC Strasbourg in the 1940s. It would appear therefore, that Pontikos, having equalled a record that had stood for over 60 years, saw it broken only a few days later.

== Relegation playoffs ==
The top two teams from the B-Division and the bottom two from the A-Division competed in a round robin group to determine the remaining two spots for the 2008 A-Division.

Pos	Team	Pld	W	D	L	GF	GA	GD	Pts	Promotion or relegation
1	Veterans (P)	3	3	0	0	0	0	0	9	promoted to 2008 A-Division
2	Rigzung	3	2	0	1	0	0	0	6	remained in 2008 A-Division
3	RIHS (R)	3	1	0	2	0	0	0	3	relegated to 2008 B-Division
4	Wolfland	3	0	0	3	0	0	0	0	remained in 2008 B-Division

Updated to match(es) played on 11 July 2008. Source:
Rules for classification: 1) points; 2) goal difference; 3) number of goals scored.
(P) Promoted; (R) Relegated

=== Play off matches ===
5 August 2007

RIHS	Beat	Wolfland
	Source

6 August 2007

Rigzung	Lost	Veterans
	Source

7/8 August 2007

Wolfland	Lost	Rigzung
	Source

7/8 August 2007

Veterans	Beat	RIHS
	Source

9 August 2007

Veterans	4-3	Wolfland
	Source

10 August 2007

Rigzung	4-0	RIHS
	Source

== Topscorers ==
Best scorers	Team	Goals
Passang Tshering	Transport United	28
