= 2013 Bhutan National League =

Bhutan National League
- Season: 2013
- Dates: 14 September – 23 November
- Champions: Ugyen Academy
- AFC President's Cup: Ugyen Academy
- Matches: 30
- Goals: 137 (4.57 per match)
- Biggest home win: Druk Pol 15–0 Phuentsholing
- Biggest away win: Phuentsholing 1–10 Yeedzin
- Highest scoring: Druk Pol 15–0 Phuentsholing
- Longest unbeaten run: Yeedzin (10 matches)

The 2013 Bhutan National League started on 14 September 2013 and ended on 23 November 2013 and was the second time that a true national league competition was held in Bhutan, following from the inaugural season the previous year. Again the A-Division served as a qualifying round for teams based in Thimpu, who were then joined by regional teams for the national stage. Yeedzin won the A-Division, but were beaten into second place in the National League by Ugyen Academy.

== A-Division ==
The 2013 tournament started on 19 May 2013 and ended on 15 June 2013. Yeedzin FC qualified along with Thimphu City (known in previous seasons as Zimdra) and Dzongree. Dzongree were meant to play-off against Druk Pol (who were exempted from the A-Division competition as, being the national police force team, they were on duty during the Bhutan elections) for the final berth in the National League, but the playoff did not take place and both teams entered the National League. Druk United and Druk Star entered a round robin relegation play-of competition with the top two teams in the B-Division, Motithang FC and BMW FC. The full results are not known but it appears that either the two A-Division teams were successful or the round robin was not completed as both teams participated in the A-Division the following season.

=== League table ===
Pos	Team	Pld	W	D	L	GF	GA	GD	Pts	Qualification or relegation
1	Yeedzin (C)	8	7	1	0	27	6	+21	22	2013 Bhutan National League
2	Thimphu City	8	5	1	2	14	6	+8	16	2013 Bhutan National League
3	Dzongree	8	3	1	4	15	17	−2	10	2013 Bhutan National League
4	Druk United	8	2	0	6	11	26	−15	6	Promotion/relegation playoff
5	Druk Stars	8	1	1	6	9	21	−12	4	Promotion/relegation playoff

Updated to match(es) played on 15 June 2013. Source: Soccerway.com
Rules for classification: 1) points; 2) goal difference; 3) number of goals scored.
(C) Champions

=== Results ===
Home \ Away	STA	UTD	DZO	TPC	YEE
Druk Stars		0–2	2–2	1–3	0–4
Druk United	1–4		2–3	1–3	2–10
Dzongree	3–1	1–3		2–0	1–3
Thimphu City	3–0	2–0	3–1		0–0
Yeedzin	3–1	3–0	3–2	1–0	

Updated to match(es) played on 26 June 2014. Source:
Legend: Blue = home team win; Yellow = draw; Red = away team win.

== National League ==
=== Teams ===
Location of teams participating in the 2012-13 Bhutan National League.

A total of six teams competed in the league: three teams representing Thimphu, and three teams representing other districts.

- Yeedzin (winners of the 2013 A-Division)
- Thimphu City (runners-up in the 2013 A-Division)
- Dzongree (third place in the 2013 A-Division)
- Druk Pol (excused from the 2013 A-Division as on election duty)
- Ugyen Academy (representing Punakha District)
- Phuentsholing (representing Chukha District)

=== League table ===
Pos	Team	Pld	W	D	L	GF	GA	GD	Pts	Qualification or relegation
1	Ugyen Academy (C)	10	6	3	1	32	16	+16	21	Qualification for 2014 AFC President's Cup
2	Yeedzin	10	5	5	0	30	15	+15	20	
3	Thimphu City	10	5	3	2	29	20	+9	18	
4	Druk Pol	10	2	5	3	15	17	−2	11	
5	Dzongree	10	2	1	7	18	31	−13	7	
6	Phuentsholing	10	1	1	8	13	48	−35	4	

Updated to match(es) played on 23 November 2013. Source: Soccerway.com
Rules for classification: 1) points; 2) goal difference; 3) number of goals scored.
(C) Champions

=== Results ===
Home \ Away	POL	DZO	PHU	TPC	UGY	YEE
Druk Pol		3–2	15–1	1–1	0–5	1–1
Dzongree	1–1		7–3	0–5	1–5	2–3
Phuentsholing	1–0	1–2		1–2	1–3	1–10
Thimphu City	3–3	3–0	5–2		4–2	1–4
Ugyen Academy	1–1	3–0	4–2	5–3		3–3
Yeedzin	2–1	4–3	0–0	2–2	1–1	

Updated to match(es) played on 26 June 2014. Source:
Legend: Blue = home team win; Yellow = draw; Red = away team win.
