= 2014 Bhutan National League =

Bhutan National League
- Season: 2014
- Champions: Druk United
- Relegated: None
- AFC Cup: Druk United
- Matches: 29
- Goals: 106 (3.66 per match)
- Biggest home win: Druk Pol 6–1 Bhutan Clearing; Druk United 5–0 Druk Star
- Biggest away win: Bhutan Clearing 0–16 Thimphu City
- Highest scoring: Bhutan Clearing 0–16 Thimphu City
- Longest winning run: Druk United; Ugyen Academy; Thimphu City (4 matches)
- Longest unbeaten run: Druk United; Ugyen Academy; Thimphu City (4 matches)
- Longest losing run: Bhutan Clearing (4 matches)

The 2014 Bhutan National League was the third season of national football competition in Bhutan, having replaced the A-Division (Bhutan) in 2013. Again, the A-Division provided the qualifiers, with the top four teams in that competition being awarded places in the National League alongside regional teams. The league was sponsored by Coca-Cola. Druk United won the Championship on goal difference from Ugyen Academy and, as a result of the abolition of the AFC President's Cup, will be the first team from Bhutan to take part in the AFC Cup.

Many league games took place in front of hundreds of spectators.

== A-Division ==
The 2014 season started on 8 March 2014 and ended on 4 May 2014. Druk United won the A-Division and were joined in the National League by Thimpu City, Druk Pol and Druk Star.

=== League table ===
Pos	Team	Pld	W	D	L	GF	GA	GD	Pts	Qualification or relegation
1	Druk United	12	9	1	2	40	15	+25	28	2014 Bhutan National League
2	Thimphu City	12	8	2	2	44	24	+20	26	2014 Bhutan National League
3	Druk Pol	12	6	3	3	19	16	+3	21	2014 Bhutan National League
4	Druk Stars	12	4	5	3	29	28	+1	17	2014 Bhutan National League
5	Dzongree	12	3	3	6	12	27	−15	12	
6	Yeedzin	12	3	2	7	20	27	−7	11	
7	Bhutan U-18	12	1	0	11	13	40	−27	3	

Updated to match(es) played on 13 March 2014. Source:
Rules for classification: 1) points; 2) goal difference; 3) number of goals scored.

=== Results ===
Home \ Away	U18	UTD	POL	STA	DZO	TPC	YEE
Bhutan U-18		1–4	1–2	1–5	1–2	0–5	4–2
Druk United	3–1		3–0	8–3	7–0	5–1	2–1
Druk Pol	2–0	3–1		1–1	1–0	0–3	3–0
Druk Stars	3–1	0–1	2–4		1–1	2–2	3–1
Dzongree	2–1	0–2	0–0	1–1		5–7	1–0
Thimphu City	7–1	3–2	4–2	3–3	4–0		2–3
Yeedzin	3–1	2–2	1–1	4–5	2–0	1–3	

Updated to match(es) played on 25 October 2012. Source:
Legend: Blue = home team win; Yellow = draw; Red = away team win.

Note 1: The notion of home and away fixtures in the A-Division is moot as all games are played at Changlimithang Stadium. As such, for the purpose of this table, the first result chronologically has been deemed that team's "home" game and the second the "away" game.

== National League ==
This season, the federation increased the prize money from Nu 400,000 to 700,000 for the winners. First runners up would be given Nu 400,000, up by 200,000 from last year and the second runners up would be awarded Nu 200,000, double from last year's prize. No place is awarded to the team finishing in first place this season for the AFC President's Cup. This is because 2014 is the final edition of the cup to be held. Instead, the six teams which qualify for the 2014 AFC President's Cup final stage will enter the 2015 AFC Cup play-offs, and from 2015 onwards, centralized qualifiers will determine six teams which enter the AFC Cup play-offs. Since Ugyen Academy lost all three of their games in the 2014 competition, there will be no Bhutanese representative in the AFC Cup until at least 2016.

The national league has struggled to attract spectators though, with only around fifty people attending matches, even when top teams are involved. This is in contrast to prior years when large crowds would come to Changlimithang even for inter-school tournaments and this downturn in spectator numbers has been attributed to the widespread availability of foreign leagues on television providing a much greater level of entertainment. Additionally, difficulties in obtaining visa's for foreign players to play in the National League inhibit its attraction to local spectators. Thimphu City attempted to bring a player in from the English Premier League, but were unable to do so because of visa issues.

=== Teams ===
Location of teams participating in the 2014 Bhutan National League.

A total of six teams competed in the league: four teams representing Thimphu, who qualified as a result of their final positions in the 2014 A-Division, and two teams representing other districts.

- Bhutan Clearing (representing Chukha District)
- Druk Pol (third place in the 2014 A-Division)
- Druk Star (fourth place in the 2014 A-Division)
- Druk United (winners of the 2014 A-Division)
- Thimphu City (runners-up in the 2014 A-Division)
- Ugyen Academy (representing Punakha District)

=== League table ===
Pos	Team	Pld	W	D	L	GF	GA	GD	Pts
1	Druk United (C)	10	7	1	2	33	14	+19	22
2	Ugyen Academy	10	7	1	2	26	13	+13	22
3	Thimphu City	10	7	0	3	33	15	+18	21
4	Druk Pol	10	5	0	5	23	13	+10	15
5	Druk Star	10	2	1	7	18	31	−13	7
6	Bhutan Clearing	10	0	1	9	6	53	−47	1

Updated to match(es) played on 2 October 2014. Source: RSSSF
Rules for classification: 1) points; 2) goal difference; 3) number of goals scored.
(C) Champions

=== Results ===
Home \ Away	BCL	POL	STA	UTD	TPC	UGY
Bhutan Clearing		0–6	0–3	0–5	0–16	1–4
Druk Pol	6–1		4–2	2–1	0–3	0–1
Druk Star	2–2	0–4		4–6	3–5	3–2
Druk United	4–1	1–0	5–0		4–0	2–2
Thimphu City	3–0	1–0	1–0	2–3		2–1
Ugyen Academy	4–1	3–1	2–1	3–2	4–0	

Updated to match(es) played on 2 October 2014. Source: RSSSF
Legend: Blue = home team win; Yellow = draw; Red = away team win.

A number of the results above are disputed. Druk United v Thimphu City was also reported as a 5–0 win for Druk United, not 4–0. Druk Pol were reported to have beaten Bhutan Clearing 6–1, not 6–0. The match between Druk United and Bhutan Clearing may have finished 4–0 to Druk United, not 4–1. Some reports indicate that Thimphu City in fact scored two goals in their away match against Ugyen Academy and lost 4–2 not 4–0 and Bhutan Clearing have been reported as losing 5–1 not 5–0 in their home fixture against Druk United.
