= 1999 Bhutan A-Division =

A-Division (Bhutan)
- Season: 1999
- Champions: Druk Pol

The 1999 season of the Bhutanese A-Division was the fifth recorded season of top-flight football in Bhutan. The league was won by Druk Pol, their fourth title in a row and the first time a Bhutanese team had won four titles consecutively.
