= 1996 Bhutan A-Division =

A-Division (Bhutan)
- Season: 1996
- Champions: Druk Pol

The 1996 season of the Bhutanese A-Division was the second recorded season of top-flight football in Bhutan, with the winners, if any, during the years 1987-1995 being unknown. After the initial season, the popularity of the game waned and was only revived in the mid-1990s by the monk Khyentse Norbu. The league was won by Druk Pol.
