= 2000 Bhutan A-Division =

A-Division (Bhutan)
- Season: 2000
- Champions: Druk Pol FC

The 2000 season of the Bhutanese A-Division was the sixth recorded season of top-flight football in Bhutan, and the last before the league was officially renamed the A-Division. The league was won by Druk Pol FC, their fifth title in a row and the only time, as of 2014, that a Bhutanese team had achieved such a feat.
