= Passang Dorji =

Bhutanese politician

Member of the National Assembly of Bhutan
- Incumbent
- Assumed office 31 October 2018
- Preceded by: Wangdi Norbu
- Constituency: Bartsham Shongphu

Personal details
- Born: c. 1980 Yangner Gewog
- Party: Druk Phuensum Tshogpa (DPT)

Passang Dorji is a Bhutanese politician who has been a member of the National Assembly of Bhutan since October 2018.

== Education ==
Dorji holds a Bachelor of Arts in Economics from University of Delhi, India and a master's degree in management from University of Canberra, Australia. Dorji also holds a PhD in International Relations from City University of Hong Kong.

== Professional career ==
Dorji started his career at an employment office with the Ministry of Labour and Human Resources. He later worked as the chief reporter with Bhutan Times and editor with The Journalist. He subsequently became the first president of the Journalist Association of Bhutan. He was also the founding member and board director of Bhutan Transparency Initiative. He later worked as the consultant for United Nations Development Programme and helped in the Five Year Strategic Plan (2014–2019) of the National Assembly of Bhutan and National Council of Bhutan.

== Political career ==
Dorji was elected to the National Assembly of Bhutan as a candidate of DPT from Bartsham-Shongphu constituency in 2018 Bhutanese National Assembly election. He received 4,099 votes and defeated Tenzin Lekphell, a candidate of DNT.
