= 2008 Bhutan A-Division =

A-Division (Bhutan)
- Season: 2008
- Champions: Yeedzin
- AFC President's Cup: Yeedzin
- Matches played: 56
- Longest unbeaten run: Yeedzin (14 matches)

The 2008 season of the Bhutanese A-Division was the fourteenth recorded season of top-flight football in Bhutan. The league was won by Yeedzin FC, their first ever title, and the first time a team other than Transport United had won the league in five years. Yeedzin qualified as Bhutan's representative in the 2009 AFC President's Cup.

== Participating teams ==
- Choden
- Druk Athletic
- Druk Pol
- Druk Star
- Rigzung
- Royal Bhutan Army
- Transport United
- Yeedzin

== League table ==
Teams played each other on a home and away basis, there was no relegation or promotion.

Pos	Team	Pld	W	D	L	GF	GA	GD	Pts	Qualification
1	Yeedzin (C)	14	12	2	0	0	0	0	38	Qualified for 2009 AFC President's Cup
2	Transport United	14	11	1	2	0	0	0	34	
3	Royal Bhutan Army	14	9	1	4	0	0	0	28	

Updated to match(es) played on 9 July 2009. Source:
Note: Only the top three of the final table are available.
Rules for classification: 1) points; 2) goal difference; 3) number of goals scored.
(C) Champions
