= Ugyen Academy FC =

Association football club in Bhutan

Ugyen Academy
- Full name: Ugyen Academy Football Club
- Short name: UAFC
- Founded: 2002; 24 years ago
- Ground: Lekeythang Football Field
- Head coach: Kinley Dorji
- League: Bhutan Premier League
- 2026: Bhutan Premier League, 10th of 10
Home colours	Away colours

Ugyen Academy Football Club is a Bhutanese professional football club based in Punakha that competes in the Bhutan Premier League, the top level of Bhutanese football. They won the Bhutan National League title in 2013 and represented Bhutan in the 2014 AFC President's Cup.

== History ==
Ugyen Academy's first appearance in the national league was in the 2012–13 season, where they finished third behind eventual champions Yeedzin and Drukpol, and were involved in the season's highest scoring game, an 8–1 victory over Samtse. The following season they won the Bhutan National League, one point above Yeedzin, losing only once, 4–2 to Thimphu City. By winning the national league, Ugyen Academy were awarded Bhutan's berth in the 2014 AFC President's Cup, their first appearance in any form of continental competition. They were drawn in Group A for the group stage, along with Sheikh Russel of Bangladesh, KRL of Pakistan and Sri Lanka Air Force. All the matches were played in Sri Lanka, and Ugyen Academy lost all three matches without scoring and conceding eight goals.

Team	Pld	W	D	L	GF	GA	GD	Pts
(Bangladesh) Sheikh Russel	3	2	1	0	9	0	+9	7
Sri Lanka Air Force	3	2	0	1	4	5	−1	6
(Pakistan) KRL	3	1	1	1	3	3	0	4
(Bhutan) Ugyen Academy	3	0	0	3	0	8	−8	0

7 May 2014
16:00

Sri Lanka Air Force	1–0	(Bhutan) Ugyen Academy
Bandara 58'	Report

Sugathadasa Stadium, Colombo
Attendance: 600
Referee: Adham Makhadmeh (Jordan)

9 May 2014
14:00

Ugyen Academy (Bhutan)	0–3	(Pakistan) KRL
	Report	Afridi 1'; Dawood 14'; Qasim 90+1'

Sugathadasa Stadium, Colombo
Attendance: 100
Referee: Chaiya Mahapab (Thailand)

11 May 2014
14:00

Sheikh Russel (Bangladesh)	4–0	(Bhutan) Ugyen Academy
Millien 14'; Mithun 21', 88'; Ahmed 28'	Report

Sugathadasa Stadium, Colombo
Attendance: 200
Referee: Ali Sabah Adday Al-Qaysi (Iraq)

Ugyen Academy again took part in the National League the following season. They suffered a mediocre start to the season, drawing with eventual winners Druk United and losing to then leaders Thimphu City to find themselves lying in fourth place at the halfway stage. The team rallied in the second half however, winning all their matches bar a loss to Druk Star to end the season in second place, narrowly losing out on both the title and qualification for the 2015 AFC Cup on goal difference to Druk United.

== Honours ==
- Bhutan National/Premier League
  - Winners: 2013
  - Runners-up: 2014, 2020

== Continental record ==
- AFC President's Cup

2014: 4th in Group stage

== See also ==
- Ugyen Academy
