= Bhutan Super League =

- Organising body: Bhutan Football Federation (BFF)
- Founded: 2001; 25 years ago (as Thimphu League)
- Folded: 2020; 6 years ago
- Country: Bhutan
- Confederation: AFC
- Last champions: High Quality United (2020)
- Most championships: Drukpol (8 titles)

The Bhutan Super League, previously known as the Thimphu League and Bhutan A-Division, was the men's football league in Bhutan. Until 2012, it was the lone national top division. Between 2013 and 2020, it was played as the second division and the qualifier for the Bhutan Premier League.

== History ==
The Thimphu League has taken a number of formats during its history. Initially, the competition was held as a single round-robin group of matches, with all games being held at the national stadium, Changlimithang. In 2001, the format of football played was very similar to the later set up of a Thimphu league, including Paro taking part in a qualifying contest to join other teams from different Dzongkhags for a genuine national league. However, the main focus of the league has been on Thimpu-based teams.

Under its previous name, the A-Division was formally named as such in 2001, following five years of competition under a different, unknown name between 1996 and 2000 and what appears to have been a one-off competition in 1986.

The initial A-Division season, as noted above, consisted of a Thimphu-based qualifying round, followed by an essentially national competition, albeit hosted in Phuentsholing. Druk Star broke the domination of Drukpol by winning the A-Division that season. In 2002 the league continued to include teams from outside of Thimphu, but this time, there were no teams from Gomtu or Samtse, only from Phuentsholing and Paro. By 2003, all non-Thimphu teams had dropped out of the league to be replaced by others from the capital city who contested a single round-robin series of matches.

In 2003, a full league pyramid was established in Bhutan, with the A-Division at its head. There were nine A division clubs and nine B division clubs competing in the national league. The Bhutan football federation (BFF) introduced C division clubs, from this year, to participate in the national league. About 12 to 14 C division clubs are thought to have participated. Based on the performance in the national league, the two best teams from C division will from this point be promoted to the B division. Likewise, two B division teams will move up to A division. On the other hand, two weakest teams in each division will be relegated to a lower division.

Details are scant for 2004, but it is known that this was the first time that Bhutan submitted an entrant for any AFC tournament, with that season's champion, Transport United being awarded Bhutan's slot in the 2005 AFC President's Cup. This cemented the A-Division's position as the premier football competition in the country and it continued to supply Bhutan's President's Cup entrant until the creation of the National League.

The league settled into its Thimpu-focussed home and away set up by 2005 at the latest. This season would see the beginning of the dominance of Transport United, who picked up their second successive title and would go on to win another two to make it four in a row, only bettered by Drukpol's performance prior to the formalisation of the A-Division. However, following their final title in 2007, they began to slip down the league table, finishing second in 2008 and spending several seasons in mid-table obscurity before finally being relegated to the B-Division in 2012. As Transport United slipped, so Yeedzin were poised to take their place, winning four titles and taking one second place in the next six seasons.

2011, however, was the last edition where the A-Division held the premier spot in Bhutan's football pyramid. In an attempt to spread the popularity of the game around the country, a National League was established. The Division continues in its usual format, but now no longer supplies Bhutan's entrant to the AFC President's Cup. Instead the top teams from the Thimphu League qualify to compete in the National League against several teams from different districts.

In 2015 the A-Division was renamed the Thimphu League (Yanmar Thimphu League for sponsorship reasons), reflecting the National League's position as the preeminent football competition in the country.

In 2019, the rebranded second division named Bhutan Super League was introduced, adding clubs outside of Thimphu to its membership. Thimphu League continued to exist as part of the district leagues. The Super League ceased after the 2020 season and was replaced by the qualifying tournament for the Premier League.

== List of winners ==
List of winners
Season	Winners	Runners-up
1986	Royal Bhutan Army	Social Service
1987–1995	unknown	unknown
1996	Drukpol	unknown
1997	Drukpol	unknown
1998	Drukpol	unknown
1999	Drukpol	unknown
2000	Drukpol	unknown
2001	Druk Stars	Samtse
2002	Drukpol	unknown
2003	Drukpol	Dzongree
2004	Transport United	unknown
2005	Transport United	Drukpol
2006	Transport United	unknown
2007	Transport United	Drukpol
2008	Yeedzin	Transport United
2009	Druk Stars	Yeedzin
2010	Yeedzin	Drukpol
2011	Yeedzin	Zimdra
2012	Drukpol	Zimdra
2013	Yeedzin	Thimphu City
2014	Druk United	Thimphu City
2015	Terton	Thimphu
2016	Thimphu City	Thimphu
2017	Thimphu City	Transport United
2018	Transport United	Thimphu City
2019	Druk Stars	High Quality United
2020	High Quality United	Paro United

== Performance by club ==
Performance by teams
Team	Winners	Runners-up	Years won	Years runner-up
Drukpol	8	3	1996, 1997, 1998, 1999, 2000, 2002, 2003, 2012	2005, 2007, 2010
Transport United	5	2	2004, 2005, 2006, 2007, 2018	2008, 2017
Yeedzin	4	1	2008, 2010, 2011, 2013	2009
Druk Stars	3	0	2001, 2009, 2019	—
Thimphu City (Note: Thimphu City competed as Zimdra in 2011 and 2012.)	2	5	2016, 2017	2011, 2012, 2013, 2014, 2018
High Quality United	1	1	2020	2019
Royal Bhutan Army	1	0	1986	—
Druk United	1	0	2014	—
Terton	1	0	2015	—
Thimphu	0	2	—	2015, 2016
Social Service	0	1	—	1986
Samtse	0	1	—	2001
Dzongree	0	1	—	2003
Paro United	0	1	—	2020
