= 2012–13 Bhutan National League =

Bhutan National League
- Season: 2012–13
- Dates: 31 August 2012 – 24 February 2013
- Champions: Yeedzin
- AFC President's Cup: Yeedzin
- Matches: 50
- Goals: 116 (2.32 per match)
- Biggest home win: Ugyen Academy 8–1 Samtse
- Biggest away win: Samtse 0–4 Yeedzin
- Highest scoring: Ugyen Academy 8–1 Samtse
- Longest winning run: Druk Pol (4 games)
- Longest unbeaten run: Yeedzin (10 games)
- Longest losing run: Samtse (10 games)

The 2012–13 Bhutan National League was the first season of the Bhutan National League. It was organized by the Bhutan Football Federation and sponsored by Coca-Cola. The National League replaced the A-Division as the country's premier football competition and would provide Bhutan's entrant to the 2013 AFC President's Cup. the A-Division continues as a football competition, but is now merely a qualifying round for Thimphu-based teams. The top three teams in the A-Division progressed to the national league where they were joined by three other teams representing other districts within Bhutan. The A-Division was won by Druk Pol, but were beaten to the national title by fellow A-Division competitors Yeedzin who won the inaugural competition, their fifth top flight title overall.

== 2012 A-Division ==
The 2012 Bhutanese A-Division was the twenty sixth season of football in Bhutan. It began on 31 August 2012 and ended on 6 October 2012. As the only stadium used in the league was the Changlimithang Stadium in Thimphu, matches were played one per day, with a mid-season break from 16 to 20 September. As there was only one stadium used, the 6 teams were designated so that each team played 5 "home" games and 5 "away" games. This season marked the end of the Thimphu-based league being the top league in the country. The A-Division will now act as a qualifying tournament for the Bhutan National League, a nationwide tournament that will now provide the qualifier for the 2013 AFC President's Cup.

=== Overview ===
The A-Division was won by Druk Pol for the 8th time in their history, their first title since 2003. Druk Pol, together with Zimdra and Yeedzin, qualify for the 2012–13 Bhutan National League, which include these three teams from Thimphu together with four other teams representing the districts of Punakha, Geylegphug, Samtse and Chukha.

=== League standings ===
Pos	Team	Pld	W	D	L	GF	GA	GD	Pts	Qualification or relegation
1	Druk Pol (Q)	10	8	1	1	50	7	+43	25	Qualified for 2012–13 Bhutan National League
2	Zimdra (Q)	10	7	3	0	22	6	+16	24	Qualified for 2012–13 Bhutan National League
3	Yeedzin (Q)	10	6	2	2	54	9	+45	20	Qualified for 2012–13 Bhutan National League
4	Dzongree	10	3	0	7	15	25	−10	9	
5	Transport United (R)	10	2	0	8	14	38	−24	6	Relegated to 2013 B-Division
6	Nangpa (R)	10	1	0	9	5	75	−70	3	Relegated to 2013 B-Division

Updated to match(es) played on 29 October 2012. Source:
Rules for classification: 1) points; 2) goal difference; 3) number of goals scored.
(Q) Qualified for the phase indicated; (R) Relegated

=== Results ===
Home \ Away (Note: The notion of home and away fixtures in the A-Division is moot as all games are played at Changlimithang Stadium. As such, for the purpose of this table, the first result chronologically has been deemed that team's "home" game and the second the "away" game.)	POL	DZO	NAN	TRA	YEE	ZIM
Druk Pol		3–0	7–0	3–0	3–2	1–1
Dzongree	1–3		3–1	3–0	1–4	0–2
Nangpa	0–19	2–1		0–4	0–12	0–4
Transport United	1–10	2–5	5–2		0–6	1–2
Yeedzin	0–1	6–0	16–0	5–1		3–3
Zimdra	2–0	2–1	4–0	2–0	0–0	

Updated to match(es) played on 25 October 2012. Source:
Legend: Blue = left column team win; Yellow = draw; Red = top row team win.

== National League ==
=== Teams ===
Location of teams participating in the 2012-13 Bhutan National League.

A total of six teams competed in the league: three teams representing Thimphu, and three teams representing other districts.

- Druk Pol (winners of 2012 A-Division)
- Zimdra (runners-up of 2012 A-Division)
- Yeedzin (third place of 2012 A-Division)
- Ugyen Academy (representing Punakha District)
- Samtse (representing Samtse District)
- Phuentsholing (representing Chukha District)

Originally also a team representing Gelephug District was supposed to enter.

=== League standings ===
Pos	Team	Pld	W	D	L	GF	GA	GD	Pts	Qualification
1	Yeedzin	10	8	2	0	23	5	+18	26	Qualified for 2013 AFC President's Cup
2	Druk Pol	10	6	0	4	25	20	+5	18	
3	Ugyen Academy	10	5	2	3	22	15	+7	17	
4	Zimdra	10	5	1	4	27	17	+10	16	
5	Phuentsholing	10	3	1	6	13	22	−9	10	
6	Samtse	10	0	0	10	6	37	−31	0	

Updated to match(es) played on 24 February 2013. Source:
Rules for classification: 1) points; 2) goal difference; 3) number of goals scored.

=== Results ===
Home \ Away	POL	PHU	SAM	UGY	YEE	ZIM
Druk Pol		4–3	5–1	2–1	0–2	2–3
Phuentsholing	1–2		2–1	1–2	1–2	3–2
Samtse	1–5	0–1		1–2	0–4	0–3
Ugyen Academy	1–3	1–1	8–1		0–2	5–3
Yeedzin	2–1	2–0	3–1	1–1		4–0
Zimdra	5–1	6–0	4–0	0–1	1–1	

Updated to match(es) played on 25 October 2012. Source:
Legend: Blue = home team win; Yellow = draw; Red = away team win.
