= 2006 Bhutan A-Division =

A-Division (Bhutan)
- Season: 2006
- Champions: Transport United
- AFC President's Cup: Transport United

The 2006 season of the Bhutanese A-Division was the twelfth recorded season of top-flight football in Bhutan. The league was won by Transport United, their third title in a row and only the second time a team had achieved such a hat trick since Druk Pol in 1998.

Transport United qualified for the 2007 AFC President's Cup.
