= Transport United FC =

Association football club in Bhutan

Transport United
- Full name: Transport United Football Club
- Nickname: The Grizzly Bears
- Short name: TUFC
- Founded: 2001; 25 years ago
- Ground: Changlimithang Stadium
- Capacity: 15,000
- President: Jigme Tshewang
- League: Bhutan Premier League
- 2026: Bhutan Premier League, 4th of 10
- Website: transportunitedfc.com
Home colours	Away colours

Transport United Football Club is a Bhutanese professional football club based in Thimphu that competes in the Bhutan Premier League, the top level of Bhutanese football. The club was founded in 2001 and plays at the Changlimithang Stadium. Transport United has won five national championships, and was a dominant force in Bhutanese football throughout much of the first decade of the 21st century.

In the 2017 season, the club won the title after completing an entire season undefeated, and hence qualified for the AFC Cup for the first time.

== History ==
=== 2002–2004 ===
Transport United made their debut in the 2002 A-Division. Their final position is not known, and the only known result for them for that season was a 5–1 loss to Thimphu. More details are available for the following season, where Transport United finished third, four points behind winners Drukpol, winning five and drawing one of their eight games in the single round-robin competition. In their third season of competition, they won the A-Division and as a result were awarded Bhutan's place in the inaugural AFC President's Cup. No further details of their performance are available.

=== 2005 ===
Their success in the prior season continued in 2005 as they won their second consecutive A-Division title, winning nine and drawing two of their twelve games and qualifying in the process for the 2006 AFC President's Cup. Their first foray into continental football was less successful. They were drawn in Group A for the group stage, along with Regar-TadAZ from Tajikistan, Three Star Club from Nepal and Taipower from Taiwan. They travelled to Kathmandu where the whole tournament was being hosted, but lost all three games and did not progress to the knock-out stage. Goals from Nawang Dendup against Regar-TadAZ and Pema Chophel versus Three Flag Club were the only moments of celebration during the tournament.

=== 2006 ===
Their third title followed in the 2006 season, the first time this had been achieved since Drukpol won three in a row between 1996 and 1998. There are no details surrounding the team's performance, but they did qualify again for the 2007 AFC President's Cup. As well as the third title, Transport United took part in their second continental appearance in the 2006 AFC President's Cup, where they were drawn again in Group A for the group stage along with Khemara Keila from Cambodia, Tatung from Taiwan and the Pakistan Army team. This time, having travelled to Kuching, Malaysia where the tournament was being held, Transport United performed slightly better, losing in their first game to Khemara, only thanks to a last minute goal from Kim Son-U, when it had looked like Ugyen Wangchuk's equaliser would be enough to secure their first point. In the following game it was Transport United's turn to snatch victory at the death, with a 90th-minute strike from Wangay Dorji sealing their first-ever victory over foreign opponents. A draw would have been enough to take them through to the knockout round, but they lost 5–0 to Tatung in the final game.

=== 2007 ===
Transport United experienced further success the following season, winning their fourth title in a row, the only time a team has ever won four A-Division titles in a row (Drukpol has won five national titles in a row between 1996 and 2000, but these were prior to the formation of the A-Division). Details for this season are also scant, but in the game between Transport United and RIHS FC, Passang Tshering scored seventeen goals. Sources indicate that the most goals scored by a single player in a game is 16, scored by Panagiotis Pontikos of Olympos Xylofagou against SEK Ayios Athanasios in May 2007 and by Stephane Stanis for RC Strasbourg in the 1940s. It would appear therefore, that Pontikos, having equalled a record that had stood for over 60 years, saw it broken only a few days later. The club also participated in their third consecutive AFC President's Cup, this time held in Lahore, Pakistan. They were drawn for the third time in Group A for the group stage, along with Regar-TadAZ, Ratnam SC from Sri Lanka and the Pakistan Army team. The team got off to the worst possible start, conceding 13 against Regar-TadAZ and 6 against Ratnam SC, with only Gyeltshen's goal against the Sri Lankans providing any sort of comfort. In the final game though, they were able to defeat the Pakistan Army team 3–2, with two goals from Wangay Dorji and one from Sonam Jamtsho.

=== 2008 ===
Transport United's domestic dominance came to an end in 2008 when they were beaten into second place by Yeedzin and their four-year run of titles came to an end. An early loss 2–1 to Yeedzin meant that they trailed them by a point at the half way stage of the season, having won all of their other games. They were unable to catch Yeedzin in the second half of the season, as both teams vied for the title. Both Transport united and Yeedzin drew another game each and they went into the final game of the season against each other with Yeedzin still only one point clear. Yeedzin were victorious in this winner takes all encounter taking the game 2–1 to deny Transport united a fifth consecutive title by four points. They still however, had one more appearance in the 2008 AFC President's Cup. Drawn in Group C this time for the group stage along with FC Aşgabat from Turkmenistan, Kanbawza of Myanmar and Ratnam SC. Once again, having travelled to Colombo where all the group games were scheduled to take place, the club got off to a bad start losing 7–1 to both Aşgabat and Ratnam SC before capitulating 11–0 to Kanbawza to leave the competition with three losses, 25 goals conceded and only two scored.

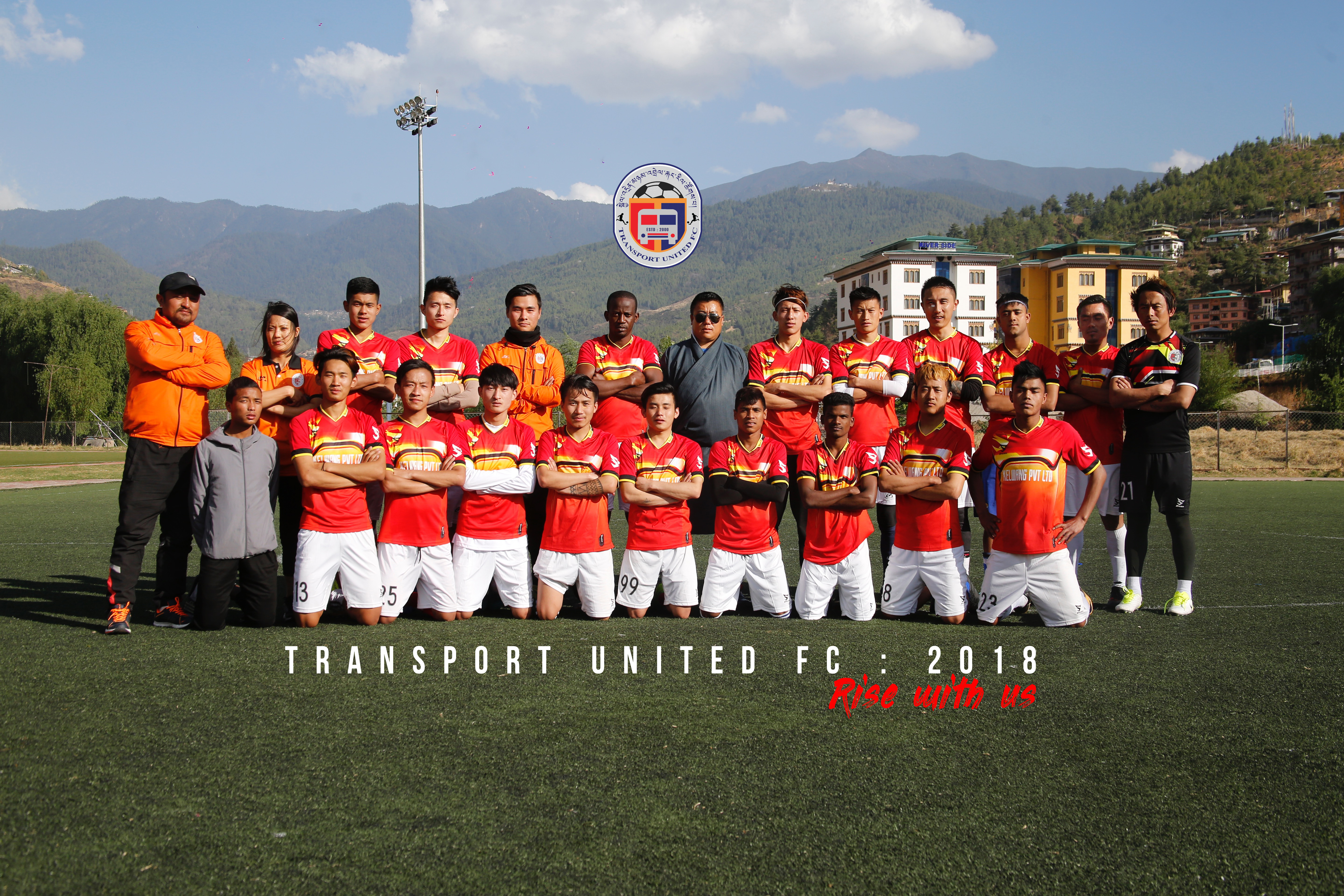
2018 squad

=== 2009–present ===
The club's form slumped in 2009 as they won only three games and drew five to finish in fifth place out of eight teams, suffering 10–1 and 7–2 defeats at the hands of Yeedzin and Druk Star respectively. An improvement the following season saw them finish in third place, behind Drukpol on goal difference, but nine points behind winner Yeedzin, winning eight and drawing one of their twelve games. This period of stagnation continued in 2011 as they finished fourth. The next season, for the first time in their history, Transport United were relegated, finishing in second to last place, with their only points coming from two victories over bottom-placed team Nangpa. Their first season in the B-Division was not particularly successful; they failed to reach the final of the knock-out stage of the competition and so did not get the chance to compete against bottom two clubs in the A-Division for the chance to return to the top flight.

They returned to the national stage in 2017, when they qualified from the Thimphu League (which now acts as the qualifiers for the Bhutan National League) into the 2017 Bhutan National League, placed second in the standings, only below Thimphu City. In the Bhutan National League, they finished the season undefeated with 9 wins and 1 draw out of 10 matches, hence claiming their fifth national title and thus qualifying for the AFC Cup for the very first time. In the 2018 AFC Cup, they were drawn against India's 2016–17 Federation Cup winners Bengaluru FC in the preliminary stage.

In November 2024, the club toured India and took part in the 40th edition of the Sikkim Gold Cup.

== Honours ==
- Bhutan National/Premier League
  - Champions (2): 2017, 2018
  - Runners-up (2): 2019, 2024
- A-Division/Thimphu League
  - Champions (5): 2004, 2005, 2006, 2007, 2018
  - Runners-up (2): 2008, 2017
- BFF President's Cup
  - Winners (1): 2022

== Continental record ==
All results list Transport United's goal tally first.

Season	Competition	Round	Opposition	Home	Away	Aggregate
2005	AFC President's Cup	Group stage	(Tajikistan) Regar-TadAZ	1–6		4th place
2005	AFC President's Cup	Group stage	(Nepal) Three Star Club	1–2		4th place
2005	AFC President's Cup	Group stage	(Chinese Taipei) Taipower	0–1		4th place
2006	AFC President's Cup	Group stage	(Cambodia) Khemara	1–2		3rd place
2006	AFC President's Cup	Group stage	Pakistan Army	1–0		3rd place
2006	AFC President's Cup	Group stage	(Chinese Taipei) Tatung	0–5		3rd place
2007	AFC President's Cup	Group stage	(Tajikistan) Regar-TadAZ	0–13		3rd place
2007	AFC President's Cup	Group stage	(Sri Lanka) Ratnam SC	1–6		3rd place
2007	AFC President's Cup	Group stage	Pakistan Army	3–2		3rd place
2008	AFC President's Cup	Group stage	(Sri Lanka) Ratnam SC	1–7		4th place
2008	AFC President's Cup	Group stage	(Turkmenistan) FC Aşgabat	1–7		4th place
2008	AFC President's Cup	Group stage	(Myanmar) Kanbawza	0–11		4th place
2018	AFC Cup	Preliminary round	(India) Bengaluru	0–0	0–3	0–3
2019	AFC Cup	Preliminary round	(Sri Lanka) Colombo	1–2	1–7	2–9

== Women's team ==
Transport United FC also runs a women's team under the same name which plays in the Bhutan Women's National League, the top tier of the Bhutanese women's club football.

=== Domestic record ===
- Bhutan Women's National League
  - Runners-up (1): 2025

=== Continental record ===
All results list Transport United's goal tally first.

Season	Competition	Round	Opposition	Result	Position
2025–26	SAFF Women's Club Championship	League stage	(Pakistan) Karachi City	0–0	3rd of 5
2025–26	SAFF Women's Club Championship	League stage	(India) East Bengal	0–4	3rd of 5
2025–26	SAFF Women's Club Championship	League stage	(Nepal) APF	0–0	3rd of 5
2025–26	SAFF Women's Club Championship	League stage	(Bangladesh) Nasrin SA	1–1	3rd of 5
