= 2004 Bhutan A-Division =

A-Division (Bhutan)
- Season: 2004
- Champions: Transport United
- AFC President's Cup: Transport United

The 2004 season of the Bhutanese A-Division was the tenth recorded season of top-flight football in Bhutan. The league was won by Transport United, their first title. Transport United were Bhutan's representatives in the 2005 AFC President's Cup.
