= Changlimithang Stadium =

Stadium in Thimphu, Bhutan

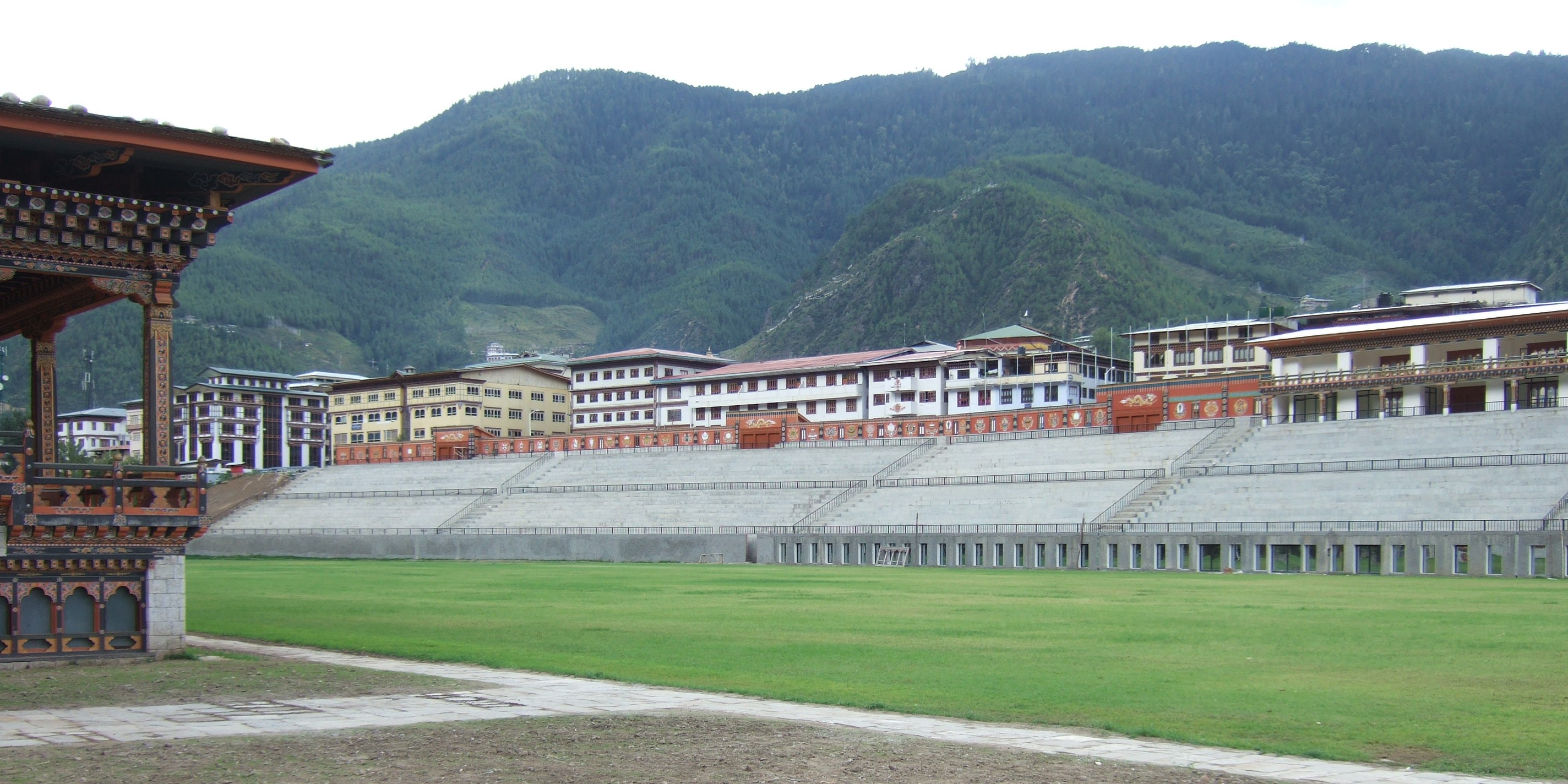
- Interactive map of Changlimithang Stadium
- Address: Changlimithang, Chang Lam, Thimphu, Bhutan
- Location: Thimphu, Bhutan
- Coordinates: 27°28′17.1″N 89°38′27.8″E
- Owner: Bhutan Olympic Committee
- Operator: Bhutan Football Federation (BFF)
- Capacity: 15,000
- Surface: AstroTurf
- Scoreboard: Yes
- Field size: 102.4m x 69.4m
- Field shape: Rectangular

Construction
- Groundbreaking: 1974
- Opened: 1974; 52 years ago
- Renovated: 2008, 2011

Tenants
- Bhutan Premier League; BPL Qualifiers; Thimphu Dzongkhag (District) League; Jigme Dorji Wangchuk Memorial Gold Cup; Coronation Championship; Women's National League; Women's Thimphu League (sometimes); Bhutan national football team Bhutan men's national volleyball team Bhutan Archery Federation

The Changlimithang Stadium is a multi-purpose stadium in Thimphu, Bhutan, which serves as the national stadium of Bhutan. It is predominantly used for football matches and is the home of the Bhutan national football team, other national selections and a number of Thimphu-based football clubs. The Changlimithang Stadium sometimes hosts Bhutan Premier League association football matches with thousands of spectators in attendance.

The stadium also regularly plays host to women's football, archery tournaments, minifootball and some volleyball matches. The stadium was initially constructed in 1974 for the coronation of the fourth King of Bhutan, Jigme Singye Wangchuck, but was completely refurbished in 2007 in advance of the coronation of Jigme Khesar Namgyel Wangchuck. Floodlights were added to the football pitch in 2009 and an evergreen turf laid in 2012, to coincide with the start of the first season of the National League. Located 2,300 meters (7,500 ft) above sea level, the stadium is one of the highest in the world. It has raised numerous controversies in footballing circles, as its significant altitude affects the absorption of oxygen in the human body, offering considerable advantage to the home teams who are more accustomed to such conditions.

== Original stadium ==
Changlimithang is built on the site of a decisive battle in Bhutan's history, fought in 1885, which established the supremacy of Ugyen Wangchuck, his coronation as the first Druk Gyalpo and led to the unification of Bhutan following a series of civil wars and rebellions between 1882 and 1885. Construction for the original stadium was completed in 1974 in time for the coronation of the fourth Druk Gyaplo, Jigme Singye Wangchuck, and at that time the whole park covered an area of approximately 11 hectares, with seating capacity of about 10,000 spectators. As well as taking on the role of national stadium and being the home to the Bhutan national football team and national archery competitions, the stadium also provided facilities for squash, billiard and tennis, in addition to being the headquarters of Bhutan Olympic Committee.

== Refurbishment ==
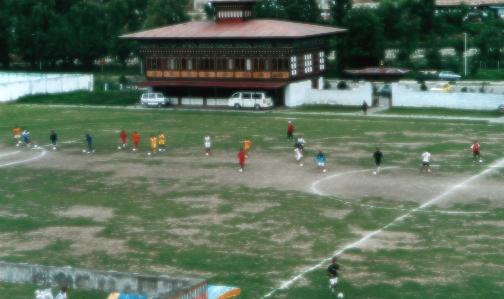
The stadium as set of 2002 documentary The Other Final

The stadium was completely refurbished and reopened in 2008 for the dual celebration of the coronation of the fifth Druk Gyalpo Jigme Khesar Namgyel Wangchuck and the centenary of the establishment of the House of Wangchuck and the reunification of the country. Redevelopment plans were drawn up by the Ministry of Works and Human Settlement in conjunction with the National Steering Committee for the Coronation Celebrations. The old stand which consisted of 6 rows of seating with a capacity of around 10,000 was completely demolished to be replaced with a stand consisting of 21 rows of seating. This stand would provide substantial seating not just around the area of the football pitch, but also down alongside the archery range. In order to complete this construction, the squash and basketball courts were demolished, although the increased size of the stand allowed for the creation of areas for table tennis and shooting as well as facilities for bathing and changing underneath the seating area. In addition to changes to the sporting venues within the facility, the Olympic association were provided with new offices, the royal pavilion was expanded to increase guest capacity and the banqueting hall was renovated. Two new parks were also created on the land surrounding the facility: one between the car park and the river and another nearer the archery range were laid out at a cost of Nu 2,000,000. These renovations took two years and cost a total of Nu 230,000,000. The newly refurbished stadium was opened by Prince Jigyel Ugyen Wangchuck.

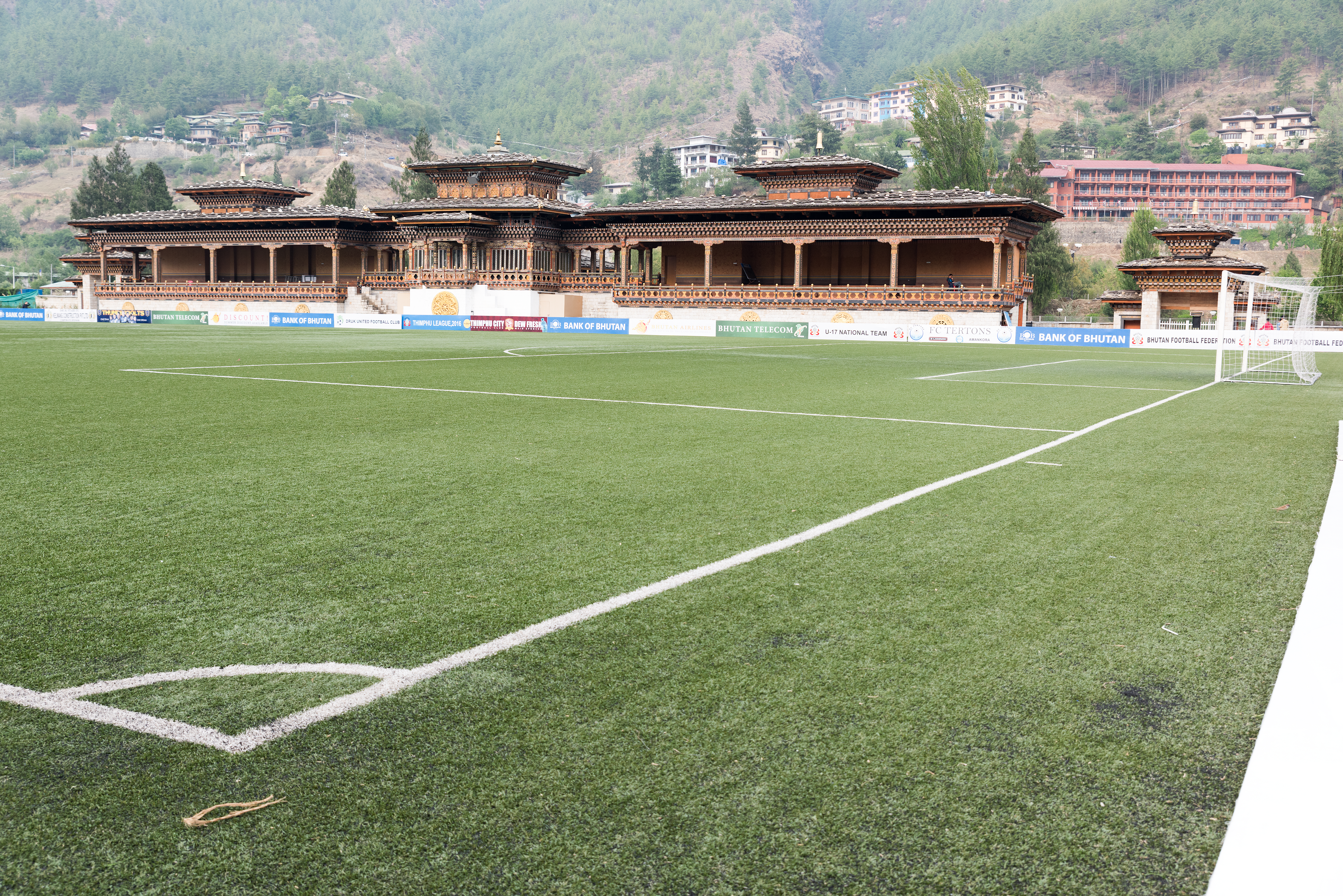
A view of the VIP stand

Further enhancements were made to the football pitch in 2011, when floodlighting was added. There had been a desire to include floodlighting at the stadium since 2006, but this had not been achieved due to the high cost of installation. A trip to Bhutan by Tata Group owner Ratan Tata led to an agreement between Tata Power, Druk Green and the Bhutan Olympic Committee to install floodlighting, with Tata bearing the cost of installation as an act of corporate social responsibility. The total cost of installing the floodlighting was Rs 13,230,000.

Further refurbishment was announced in June 2016. The first improvements included installation of plastic seats on the concrete galleries, installation of additional restroom facilities, and expansion of player facilities, such as locker rooms. It was announced that plastic seats would be installed in other sections of the stadium pending budget. The Nu 35 million costs were provided by the government of India.

== Modern usage ==
As well as continuing to hold sporting events, the facility has been utilised for wider public occasions including the wedding of Jigme Khesar Namgyel Wangchuck and Jetsun Pema. Despite the increase in capacity a few years earlier, the stadium was unable to hold all of the people who wished to attend the occasion.

Following the wedding, more improvements were made to the football pitch, with the grass field being replaced with an artificial surface to improve the performance of the players and add additional durability to the facility as a whole. Historically, it had been very difficult to maintain the ground to an acceptable standard, with an uneven, rain-soaked pitch leading to mocking calls from spectators in the mid-1990s.

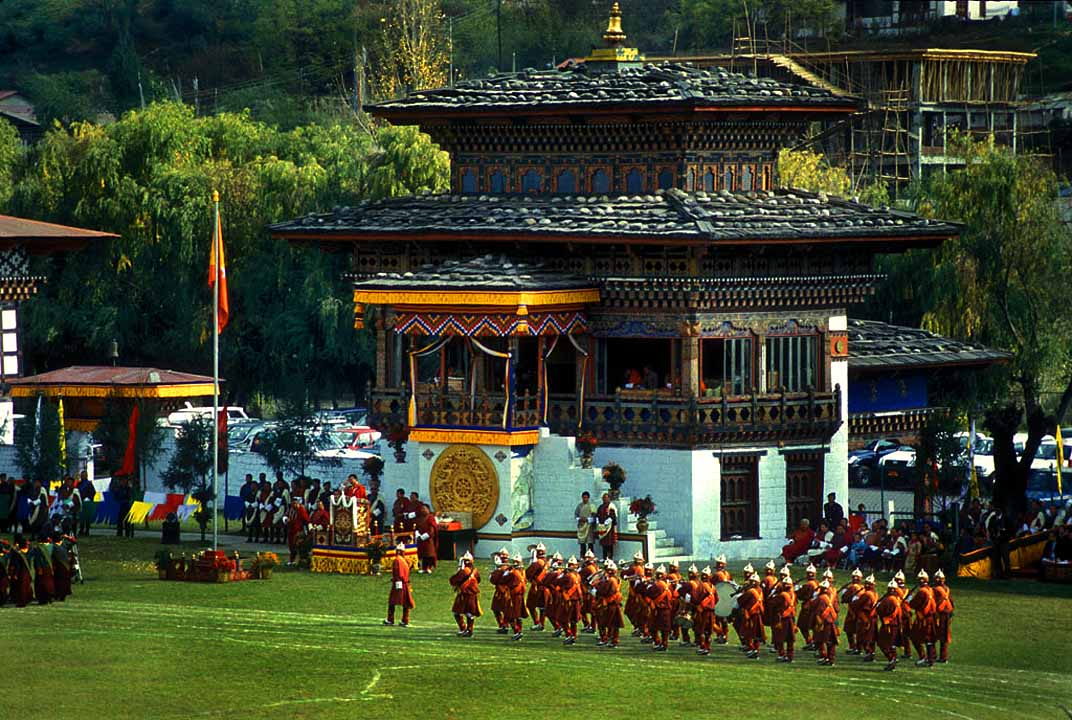
Used for archery

Financial support from FIFA enabled the project to go ahead and work started at the ground in March 2012 with the artificial turf being laid in November and finished in December the same year. As part of a two-day visit to Bhutan in March 2012, FIFA president Sepp Blatter performed the ground-breaking ceremony for the new pitch, promising that FIFA would support Bhutanese football. However, there were delays in completing the upgrade as cold weather at the beginning of the project prevented workers from starting construction and the monsoon weather in the summer hampered the ability of suppliers to deliver materials such as cement to the site. The delays were such that they nearly resulted in a postponement to the start of the national league, with the Bhutan Football Federation considering moving the initial matches to the Royal Bhutan Police's ground. The playing surface was manufactured in the Netherlands and was laid by companies from England and the Netherlands, as the first part of a two-stage series of works to install artificial turf at both Changlimithang and Changjiji football ground, also in Thimphu. The first match to be played on the new pitch was the opening match in the inaugural edition of the Bhutan National League between Druk Pol and Ugyen Academy. The President of the Bhutan Olympic Committee, Jigyel Ugyen Wangchuk, having officially opened the new playing surface, then took part in the first match as a player for Druk Pol. The total cost of the new pitch was estimated to $900,000.

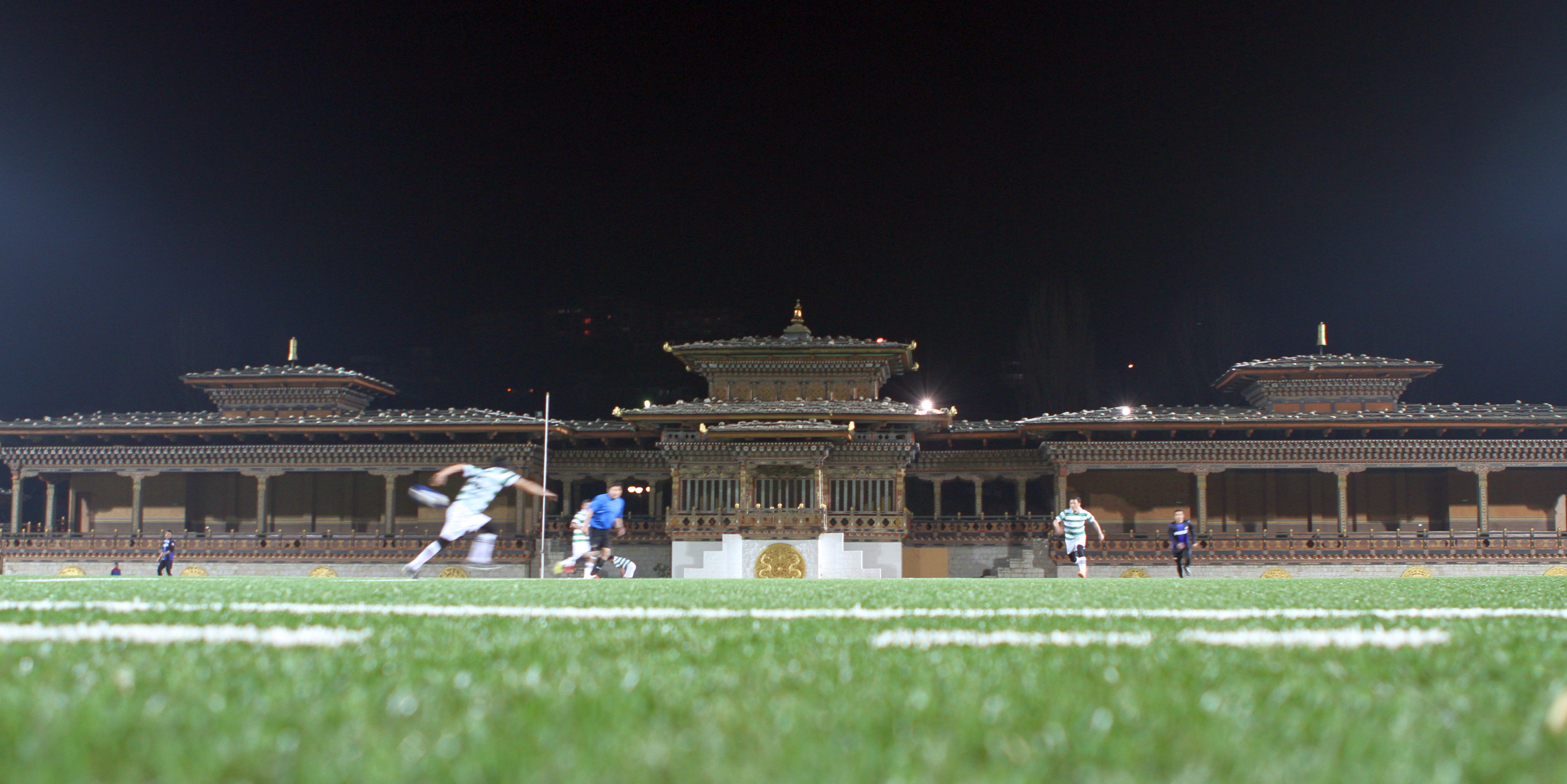
Football training at night

Unusually for a national stadium, and as a result of the conversion of the playing surface to artificial turf, the football field at Changlimithang is available for public hire and is extremely popular with people in Thimphu, with the pitch booked for public use from 5 pm - 1am most days during the week as office workers seek to make use of it and from 7 am to 9 pm at weekends. This has proved to be a valuable source of income for the Bhutan Football Federation. With teams needing to make bookings weeks in advance, the Federation made Nu 75,000 in the first fortnight that the pitch was available to the public, with the money gained from hire charges going towards financing additional artificial surfaces planned for elsewhere in the country. Demand for the chance to play on an artificial surface is now so great that the Bhutan Football Federation prepared to hire out the artificial pitch at Changjiji, once available only to train members of the national squad.

Changlimithang played host to the FIFA World Cup trophy as part of its global tour prior to the 2014 FIFA World Cup.

English singer-songwriter Ed Sheeran performed at Changlimithang on 24 January 2025 as part of his +–=÷× Tour. This marked the first international concert held in Bhutan.

== See also ==
- Centenary and Coronation Park
