= 2011 in Burmese football =

The 2011 season is the 59th season of competitive football in Burma.

== National teams ==
The home team or the team that is designated as the home team is listed in the left column; the away team is in the right column.

Win Draw Loss

=== Senior ===
==== Friendly matches ====
18 June 2011	Malaysia	2 – 0	Myanmar	Kota Bharu, Malaysia
20:45 UTC+08	Zainal 27'; Bakhtiar 54'	(Report)		Stadium: Sultan Mohammad IV Stadium; Attendance: 10,000; Referee: Nagor Noor Mohamed (Malaysia)

14 July 2011	Thailand	1 – 0	Myanmar	Buriram, Thailand
18:00 UTC+07		(Report)		Stadium: I-mobile Stadium

15 July 2011	Thailand	1 – 1	Myanmar	Buriram, Thailand
18:00 UTC+07		(Report)		Stadium: I-mobile Stadium

==== 2012 AFC Challenge Cup qualification ====
21 March 2011 Group A	Myanmar	1 – 1	Philippines	Yangon, Myanmar
15:30 UTC+06:30	Lwin 90+3'	(Report)	Younghusband 76' (pen.)	Stadium: Thuwunna Stadium; Attendance: 5,000

23 March 2011 Group A	Bangladesh	2 – 0	Myanmar	Yangon, Myanmar
18:00 UTC+06:30	Ahmed 10'; Komol 88'	(Report)		Stadium: Thuwunna Stadium; Attendance: 3,000

25 March 2011 Group A	Myanmar	1 – 3	Palestine	Yangon, Myanmar
15:00 UTC+06:30	Aung 25' (pen.)	(Report)	Alyan 39', 90'; Harbi 71'	Stadium: Thuwunna Stadium; Attendance: 1,500

==== 2014 FIFA World Cup qualification ====
29 June 2011 AFC first round	Mongolia	1 – 0	Myanmar	Ulan Bator, Mongolia
18:30 UTC+08	Tsend-Ayush 48'	(Report)		Stadium: MFF Football Centre; Attendance: 3,500; Referee: Kim Jong-Hyeok (South Korea)

3 July 2011 AFC first round	Myanmar	2 – 0	Mongolia	Yangon, Myanmar
15:30 UTC+06:30	Soe 61'; Naing 85'	(Report)		Stadium: Thuwunna Stadium; Attendance: 18,000; Referee: Liu Kwok Man (Hong Kong)

23 July 2011 AFC second round	Oman	2 – 0	Myanmar	Seeb, Oman
19:30 UTC+04	Al Hosni 21'; Al Ajmi 79'	(Report)		Stadium: Seeb Stadium; Attendance: 6,300; Referee: Ali Sabbagh (Lebanon)

28 July 2011 AFC second round	Myanmar	Abandoned (Note: Match abandoned after 40 minutes with the score at 0-2 due to crowd trouble.)	Oman	Yangon, Myanmar
15:30 UTC+06:30		(Report)	Al Hosni 22'; Al Ajmi 39' (pen.)	Stadium: Thuwunna Stadium; Referee: Ryuji Sato (Japan)

=== Under-19 ===
==== 2012 AFC U-19 Championship qualification ====
31 October 2011 Group F	Laos	2 – 2	Myanmar	Ho Chi Minh City, Vietnam
19:00 UTC+07	Phoutthasay 10'; Khanthavong 52'	(Report)	Y. Oo 78', 90+3'	Stadium: Thong Nhat Stadium; Attendance: 200; Referee: Ryuji Sato (Japan)

2 November 2011 Group F	Myanmar	0 – 2	North Korea	Ho Chi Minh City, Vietnam
16:00 UTC+07		(Report)	Ju 57'; Aung 77' (o.g.)	Stadium: Thong Nhat Stadium; Attendance: 200; Referee: Nivon Robesh Gamini (Sri Lanka)

4 November 2011 Group F	Vietnam	2 – 2	Myanmar	Ho Chi Minh City, Vietnam
19:00 UTC+07	Hiển 4' (pen.), 83' (pen.)	(Report)	N. Oo 8' (pen.), 20' (pen.)	Stadium: Thong Nhat Stadium; Attendance: 200; Referee: Rustam Kholov (Tajikistan)

8 November 2011 Group F	Myanmar	0 – 0	Malaysia	Ho Chi Minh City, Vietnam
16:00 UTC+07		(Report)		Stadium: Thong Nhat Stadium; Attendance: 200; Referee: Chaiya Mahapab (Thailand)

=== Under-16 ===
==== 2012 AFC U-16 Championship qualification ====
12 September 2011 Group G	Indonesia	4 – 1	Myanmar	Bangkok, Thailand
18:00 UTC+07	Puhuri 8', 29', 70'; Ihza 45+2'	(Report)	K. Oo 80'	Stadium: Rajamangala Stadium; Attendance: 200; Referee: Yasser Al Rawahi (Oman)

14 September 2011 Group G	Australia	4 – 0	Myanmar	Bangkok, Thailand
18:00 UTC+07	Warland 20'; De Silva 76', 87'; Tombides 79'	(Report)		Stadium: Rajamangala Stadium; Attendance: 400; Referee: Lee Dong Jun (South Korea)

17 September 2011 Group G	Myanmar	1 – 4	Thailand	Bangkok, Thailand
18:00 UTC+07	A. Thu 45+2'	(Report)	Kannoo 2' (pen.); Puangbut 15'; Pamornprasert 54' (pen.); Tiammung 90+3'	Stadium: Rajamangala Stadium; Attendance: 300; Referee: Mohd Nafeez Abdul (Malaysia)

19 September 2011 Group G	Hong Kong	2 – 4	Myanmar	Bangkok, Thailand
15:00 UTC+07	Ching 3' (pen.); Philip 64'	(Report)	S. Tun 48'; Z. Tun 80' (pen.); N. Aung 89'; Wanna 90+3'	Stadium: Rajamangala Stadium; Attendance: 100; Referee: Singh Sukhbir (Singapore)

22 September 2011 Group G	Myanmar	7 – 0	Guam	Bangkok, Thailand
18:00 UTC+07	Wanna 4', 24', 57'; Phyo 25', 32', 36', 65'	(Report)		Stadium: Rajamangala Stadium; Attendance: 100; Referee: Yasser Al Rawahi (Oman)

== League Tables ==
=== Myanmar National League ===
Pos	Team	Pld	W	D	L	GF	GA	GD	Pts	Qualification
1	Yangon United (C)	22	17	3	2	50	15	+35	54	2012 AFC Cup group stage
2	Ayeyawady United	22	15	7	0	41	11	+30	52	2012 AFC Cup qualifying play-off (Note: Automatically advanced to the group stage due to restructuring of the East Zone playoffs)
3	Zeya Shwe Myay	22	14	3	5	46	25	+21	45	
4	Kanbawza	22	9	6	7	27	21	+6	33	
5	Okktha United	22	9	6	7	27	26	+1	33	
6	Naypyidaw	22	8	6	8	33	28	+5	30	
7	Magway	22	8	6	8	32	32	0	30	
8	Southern Myanmar United	22	5	10	7	23	25	−2	25	
9	Yadanabon	22	6	5	11	28	31	−3	23	
10	Manaw Myay	22	4	6	12	18	33	−15	18	
11	Rakhapura United	22	4	6	12	24	42	−18	18	
12	Zwegabin United	22	1	0	21	11	71	−60	3	

Source: Myanmar National League
(C) Champions

== Burmese clubs in international competitions ==
Club	Competition	Final round
Yadanarbon F.C.	2011 AFC President's Cup	

=== Yadanarbon F.C. ===
13 May 2011 President's Cup Group B	Yadanarbon (Myanmar)	6 – 0	(Bhutan) Yeedzin	Yangon, Myanmar
15:30 UTC+06:30	Paing 4', 50'; Soe 11', 15', 36'; Koné 40'	(Report)		Stadium: Thuwunna Stadium; Attendance: 4,000; Referee: Dmitry Mashentsev (Kyrgyzstan)

15 May 2011 President's Cup Group B	Jabal Al Mukaber (Palestine)	3 – 4	(Myanmar) Yadanarbon	Yangon, Myanmar
18:00 UTC+06:30	Maraabba 8'; Aliwisat 27'; Al Amour 39'	(Report)	Hasan 41' (o.g.); Paing 45+3', 58'; Soe 90+4'	Stadium: Thuwunna Stadium; Attendance: 4,500; Referee: Hedayat Mombeni (Iran)

17 May 2011 President's Cup Group B	Yadanarbon (Myanmar)	1 – 1	(Tajikistan) Istiqlol	Yangon, Myanmar
15:30 UTC+06:30	Paing 90+3' (pen.)	(Report)	Davronov 57'	Stadium: Thuwunna Stadium; Attendance: 6,000; Referee: Perera Hettikankanamge (Sri Lanka)

21 September 2011 President's Cup Final stage	Yadanarbon (Myanmar)	0 – 4	(Cambodia) Phnom Penh Crown	Kaohsiung, Taiwan
19:00 UTC+08		(Report)	Njoku 3', 83'; Sokumpheak 22'; Sopanha 32'	Stadium: Kaohsiung National Stadium; Attendance: 422; Referee: Mohammed Abdullah Hassan (United Arab Emirates)

23 September 2011 President's Cup Final stage	Neftchi (Kyrgyzstan)	8 – 2	(Myanmar) Yadanarbon	Kaohsiung, Taiwan
16:00 UTC+08	Pavlov 5', 73', 90+2'; Djamshidov 33', 87'; Dzhumataev 79', 90'; Dzhalilov 86'	(Report)	Soe 35'; Rakhmanjonov 47' (o.g.)	Stadium: Kaohsiung National Stadium; Attendance: 269; Referee: Akbar Bakhshi Zadeh (Iran)
