= 2017 Home United FC season =

Home United
2017 season
- Chairman: Anselm Lopez
- Head coach: Aidil Sharin
- Stadium: Bishan Stadium
- S.League: 3rd
- Singapore Cup: Semi-finals
- Top goalscorer: League: (Croatia) Stipe Plazibat; 25 goals All: (Croatia) Stipe Plazibat; 37 goals
Home colours	Away colours

The 2017 season was Home United's 22nd consecutive season in the top flight of Singapore football and in the S.League. Along with the S.League, the club also competed in the Prime League, the Singapore Cup, Singapore League Cup and the 2017 AFC Cup.

== Squad ==
=== S.League squad ===
As of 26 January 2017.

Squad No.	Name	Nationality	Date of birth (age)	Previous club
Goalkeepers
18	Hassan Sunny	(Singapore)	2 April 1984 (age 42)	(Singapore) LionsXII
22	Eko Pradana Putra	(Singapore)	14 April 1993 (age 33)	(Singapore) Geylang International
24	Rudy Khairullah	(Singapore)	19 July 1994 (age 32)	(Singapore) Police FA (NFL Club)
Defenders
3	Afiq Yunos	(Indonesia)	10 December 1990 (age 35)	(Singapore) Tampines Rovers
4	Juma'at Jantan	(Singapore)	23 February 1984 (age 42)	(Singapore) LionsXII
5	Haziq Azman	(Singapore)	1 July 1991 (age 35)	Youth Team
6	Abdil Qaiyyim Mutalib	(Singapore)	14 May 1989 (age 37)	(Singapore) Tampines Rovers
11	Sirina Camara	(France)	12 April 1991 (age 35)	(Singapore) Étoile FC
17	Irfan Fandi	(Singapore)	13 August 1997 (age 29)	(Singapore) Young Lions
19	Sufianto Salleh	(Singapore)	9 February 1993 (age 33)	Youth team
Midfielders
2	Hariss Harun	(Singapore)	19 November 1990 (age 35)	(Malaysia) Johor Darul Ta'zim FC
7	Aqhari Abdullah	(Singapore)	9 July 1991 (age 35)	(Singapore) LionsXII
8	Song Ui-young	(South Korea)	8 November 1993 (age 33)	Youth Team
10	Faris Ramli	(Singapore)	24 August 1992 (age 34)	(Singapore) LionsXII
13	Izzdin Shafiq	(Singapore)	14 December 1990 (age 35)	(Singapore) Tampines Rovers
14	Shamil Sharif	(Singapore)	8 May 1992 (age 34)	(Singapore) Young Lions
15	Luqman Ismail	(Singapore)	9 March 1994 (age 32)	Youth Team
20	Christopher van Huizen	(Singapore)	28 November 1992 (age 33)	(Singapore) Young Lions
21	Anumanthan Kumar	(Singapore)	14 July 1994 (age 32)	(Singapore) Hougang United
23	Adam Swandi	(Singapore)	12 January 1996 (age 30)	(Singapore) Young Lions
Strikers
9	Stipe Plazibat	(Croatia)	31 August 1989 (age 37)	(Singapore) Hougang United
12	Khairul Nizam	(Singapore)	25 June 1991 (age 35)	(Singapore) LionsXII
16	Amiruldin Asraf	(Singapore)	8 January 1997 (age 29)	Youth Team

=== Prime League squad ===
As of 26 February 2017.

Squad No.	Name	Nationality	Date of birth (age)	Previous club
Goalkeepers
40	Kenji Syed Rusydi	(Singapore)	12 July 1998 (age 28)	(Singapore) Young Lions
Defenders
29	Sadik Said	(Singapore)		(Singapore) Prime League
35	Ridhuan Shamsuddin	(Singapore)		(Singapore) Hougang United Prime League
37	Ribiyanda Saswadimata	(Singapore)	5 February 1997 (age 29)	(Singapore) NFA U18
38	Arshad Shamim	(Singapore)	9 December 1999 (age 26)	(Singapore) Prime League
39	Khairul Shari	(Singapore)	14 November 1998 (age 28)	(Singapore) Prime League
Midfielders
28	Khairuddin Omar	(Singapore)	8 March 1996 (age 30)	(Singapore) Balestier Khalsa Prime League
32	Khalili Khalif	(Singapore)	3 January 1997 (age 29)	(Singapore) Hougang United Prime League
44	Syed Firdaus	(Singapore)		(Singapore) NFA U18
45	Nikesh Singh Sindu	(Singapore)		
46	Akbar Shah	(Singapore)		(Singapore) Balestier Khalsa Prime League
47	Ifwat Akid	(Singapore)		
Strikers
26	Marijan Šuto	(Croatia)	2 October 1996 (age 30)	(Singapore) Warriors FC Prime League
27	Iqram Rifqi	(Singapore)	25 February 1996 (age 30)	(Singapore) Prime League
31	Qayyum Hakim	(Singapore)		(Singapore) Prime League
36	Izzat Zalani	(Singapore)		(Singapore) Prime League
41	Shah Zulkarnean	(Singapore)		(Singapore) Balestier Khalsa Prime League

== Coaching staff ==
Source
Position	Name	Ref.
Head coach	(Singapore) Aidil Sharin	
Assistant coach	(Singapore) Saswadimata Dasuki	
Goalkeeping coach	(Singapore) Adi Saleh	
Team manager	(Singapore) Badri Ghent	
Physiotherapist	(Singapore) Daisy Sumampong Anarna	
Kitman		

== Transfer ==
=== Pre-season transfer ===
==== In ====
Position	Player	Transferred From	Ref
GK	(Singapore) Hassan Sunny	(Thailand) Army United	
GK	(Singapore) Rudy Khairullah	(Singapore) Police FC (NFL Club)	
DF	(Singapore) Afiq Yunos	(Singapore) Tampines Rovers	
MF	(Singapore) Christopher van Huizen	(Singapore) Young Lions	
MF	(Singapore) Izzdin Shafiq	(Singapore) Tampines Rovers	
MF	(Singapore) Hariss Harun	(Malaysia) Johor Darul Ta'zim FC	(Initially on 3months loan deal & subsequently extended to end of season.)
FW	(Singapore) Adam Swandi	(Singapore) Young Lions	
FW	(Croatia) Stipe Plazibat	(Singapore) Hougang United	
FW	(Singapore) Amiruldin Asraf	Prime League Squad	
FW	(Croatia) Marijan Šuto	(Singapore) Warriors FC Prime League Squad	

==== Out ====
Position	Player	Transferred To	Ref
GK	(Singapore) Hyrulnizam Juma'at	(Singapore) Warriors FC	
GK	(Singapore) Zulfairuuz Rudy	(Singapore) Hougang United	
DF	(Singapore) Lionel Tan	(Singapore) Hougang United	
DF	(Singapore) Yeo Hai Ngee	(Singapore) Young Lions	
DF	(Singapore) Redzwan Atan	(Singapore) Balestier United Recreation Club	
DF	(Singapore) R Aaravin	(Singapore) Young Lions	
DF	(Singapore) Shahrin Saberin	(Singapore) Young Lions	loan
DF	(Singapore) Ang Zhiwei	Warriors FC	
DF	(Singapore) Sim Teck Yi	Released	
MF	(Singapore) Azhar Sairudin	(Singapore) Hougang United	
MF	(Singapore) Zulfahmi Arifin	(Singapore) Hougang United	
MF	(Singapore) Syahiran Miswan	(Singapore) Hougang United	
FW	(Denmark) Ken Ilsø	(Malaysia) Kedah	
FW	(Singapore) Amir Zalani	(Singapore) Hougang United	
FW	(France) Ambroise Begue	Released	
FW	(Singapore) Ikhsan Fandi	(Singapore) Young Lions	

=== Mid-season transfers ===
==== In ====
Position	Player	Transferred From	Ref
MF	(Singapore) Anumanthan Kumar	(Singapore) Hougang United	National Service

==== Out ====
Position	Player	Transferred To	Ref
MF	(Singapore) Mahathir Azeman	(Singapore) Balestier Khalsa	Return to Parent Club After National Service

== Friendlies ==
=== Pre-season friendlies ===
Win Draw Loss

6 January 2017 Pre-Season Friendly	JDT II (Malaysia)	1–2	(Singapore) Home United	Pasir Gudang Stadium
	Hadi Fayyadh 87'		Faris Ramli 51' (pen.), 84'

12 January 2017 Pre-Season Friendly	Pattaya United (Thailand)	3–0	(Singapore) Home United	Nong Prue Stadium

14 January 2017 Pre-Season Friendly	Muangthong United (Thailand)	3–0	(Singapore) Home United	Muangthong Thani Lake Training Ground, Nonthaburi
	Teerasil Dangda; Cleiton Silva; Mongkol Tossakrai

17 January 2017 Pre-Season Friendly	Royal Thai Navy (Thailand)	1–1	(Singapore) Home United	Sattahip Navy Stadium
	75'		Shamil Sharif 25'

18 February 2017 Pre-Season Friendly	Juma’at XI (Singapore)	0–6	(Singapore) Home United	Bishan Stadium

=== In Season friendlies ===
21 March 2017 Friendly	Singapore Cricket Club (NFL Club)	3–3	(Singapore) Home United	Padang Field

28 March 2017	Home United (Singapore)	2–0	Singapore U22 B-Team

14 June 2017	Home United (Singapore)	8–0	(Singapore) Siglap FC (NFL Club)

24 August 2017	Home United (Singapore)	1–2	(Malaysia) Pahang FC	Bishan Stadium
	Juma'at Jantan 16'		Matheus Alves; Kogileswaran Raj

29 August 2017	Home United (Singapore)	11–0	(Singapore) Eunos Crescent FC (NFL Club)	Bishan Stadium
	Iqram Rifqi; Adam Swandi; Marijan Suto

12 September 2017	Home United (Singapore)	2–2	Singapore Cricket Club (NFL Club)	Bishan Stadium

== Team statistics ==
=== Appearances and goals ===
Numbers in parentheses denote appearances as substitute.

No.	Pos.	Player	Sleague		Singapore Cup		League Cup		AFC Cup		Total	
No.	Pos.	Player	Apps.	Goals	Apps.	Goals	Apps.	Goals	Apps.	Goals	Apps.	Goals
2	MF	(Singapore) Hariss Harun	20	0	4	0	3	1	2	1	29	2
3	DF	(Singapore) Afiq Yunos	4(2)	0	0	0	2	0	5	1	13	1
4	DF	(Singapore) Juma'at Jantan	17(2)	0	5	2	1	0	9	0	34	2
5	DF	(Singapore) Haziq Azman	6(5)	0	1(1)	0	3	0	1(2)	0	19	0
6	DF	(Singapore) Abdil Qaiyyim	16	1	3	0	1	0	5(2)	0	27	1
7	MF	(Singapore) Aqhari Abdullah	9(4)	0	4	0	0(1)	0	3(4)	0	25	0
8	MF	(South Korea) Song Ui-young	11(2)	2	5	0	0	0	7	3	25	5
9	FW	(Croatia) Stipe Plazibat	21(1)	25	4	0	3	2	9(1)	10	39	37
10	MF	(Singapore) Faris Ramli	22(1)	11	4	5	2	0	10	4	39	20
11	DF	(France) Sirina Camara	12	0	0(2)	0	2	0	8	0	24	0
12	FW	(Singapore) Khairul Nizam	8(4)	7	0	0	1(1)	0	6(3)	1	23	8
13	MF	(Singapore) Izzdin Shafiq	16(1)	0	2(1)	0	3	0	7	1	30	1
14	MF	(Singapore) Shamil Sharif	13(4)	1	3	0	1(1)	0	5(2)	0	29	1
15	MF	(Singapore) Luqman Ismail	0(1)	0	0	0	1	0	0	0	2	0
16	FW	(Singapore) Amiruldin Asraf	8(14)	2	1	1	0	0	3(5)	1	32	4
17	DF	(Singapore) Irfan Fandi	17	4	2	0	0	0	7	1	26	5
18	GK	(Singapore) Hassan Sunny (captain)	19	0	4	0	2	0	9	0	34	0
19	DF	(Singapore) Sufianto Salleh	8(5)	0	3	0	3	0	1(1)	0	21	0
20	MF	(Singapore) Christopher van Huizen	7(2)	0	3	0	0	0	3(2)	0	17	0
21	MF	(Singapore) Anumanthan Kumar	6	1	1	0	0	0	0	0	7	1
22	GK	(Singapore) Eko Pradana Putra	0	0	0	0	0	0	1	0	1	0
23	FW	(Singapore) Adam Swandi	15(3)	4	3	0	0	0	8(1)	3	30	7
24	GK	(Singapore) Rudy Khairullah	5	0	1	0	1	0	0	0	7	0
26	FW	(Croatia) Marijan Šuto	1(8)	0	1(2)	0	1(1)	0	1(6)	0	21	0
27	FW	(Singapore) Iqram Rifqi	3(7)	0	1(4)	1	2(1)	1	0	0	18	2
38	MF	(Singapore) Arshad Shamim	0	0	0(2)	0	0	0	0	0	2	0
39	DF	(Singapore) Khairul Shari	0	0	0	0	0(1)	0	0	0	1	0
44	MF	(Singapore) Syed Firdaus	0	0	0(2)	0	0	0	0	0	2	0
Players who have played this season but had left the club or on loan to other club
21	MF	(Singapore) Mahathir Azeman	0	0	0	0	0	0	1	0	1	0

== Competitions ==
=== Overview ===
Competition	Record							
Competition	P	W	D	L	GF	GA	GD	Win %
S.League	24	15	5	4	58	26	+32	62.50
AFC Cup	10	7	1	2	26	18	+8	70.00
Singapore Cup	5	3	0	2	9	7	+2	60.00
League Cup	3	0	1	2	4	6	−2	0.00
Total	42	25	7	10	97	57	+40	59.52

=== S.League ===
Win Draw Loss

27 February 2017 Round 1	Home United (Singapore)	6–1	(Singapore) Young Lions FC	Bishan Stadium
	Faris Ramli 23' (penalty missed) 58; Stipe Plazibat 29', 40', 55', 75'; Khairul Nizam 61'; Song Ui-young (yellow card) 73'; Adam Swandi (yellow card) 78'	Report	Zulqarnaen Suzliman 51'; Hami Syahin (yellow card) 69'; Shahrin Saberin (yellow card) 81'	Referee: Nathan Chan

3 March 2017 Round 2	Brunei DPMM FC	1–3	(Singapore) Home United	Hassanal Bolkiah National Stadium
	Rafael Ramazotti 59'; Wardun Yussof (yellow card) 65'; Yura Indera Putera (yellow card) 86'		Stipe Plazibat (penalty scored) 9',37' (yellow card) 80'; Faris Ramli 76'; Sirina Camara (yellow card) 55'; Song Ui-young (yellow card) 90'	Attendance: 2,729; Referee: Farhad Mohd

1 April 2017 Round 3 (Rescheduled)	Home United (Singapore)	2–2	(Singapore) Albirex Niigata (S)	Bishan Stadium
	Stipe Plazibat 33'; Faris Ramli 36'; Izzdin Shafiq (yellow card) 74'; Sirina Camara (yellow card) 87'	Report	Tsubasa Sano 45'; Kento Nagasaki 87' (pen.); Ryota Nakai (yellow card) 90'	Attendance: 2,143; Referee: W Ravisanthiran

9 April 2017 Round 4	Hougang United (Singapore)	0–2	(Singapore) Home United	Hougang Stadium
	Lionel Tan (yellow card) 17'; Nazrul Nazari (yellow card) 28'; Ali Hudzaifi (yellow card) 75'		Irfan Fandi 60'; Stipe Plazibat 72'; Aqhari Abdullah (yellow card) 87'	Attendance: 1,570; Referee: Farhad Mohd

2 May 2017 Round 5 (Rescheduled)	Home United (Singapore)	1–0	(Singapore) Balestier Khalsa	Bishan Stadium
	Irfan Fandi 27'; Marijan Šuto (yellow card) 34'; Abdil Qaiyyim (yellow card) 41'; Sufianto Salleh (yellow card) 54'		Kyaw Zayar Win (yellow card) 40'; Ahmad Syahir (yellow card) 45'	Attendance: 1,050; Referee: Muhd Taqi

22 April 2017 Round 6	Warriors FC (Singapore)	2–2	(Singapore) Home United	Choa Chu Kang Stadium
	Shahril Ishak 81' (pen.) 87'; Hyrulnizam Juma'at (yellow card) 5'; Firdaus Kasman (yellow card) 38'; Hafiz Osman (yellow card) 21' (red card) 70'; Joël Tshibamba (yellow card) 58'; Baihakki Khaizan (yellow card) 59'; Ho Wai Loon (yellow card) 79'		Stipe Plazibat 4' (pen.) 47'; Sirina Camara (yellow card) 19'; Hariss Harun (yellow card) 28'; Afiq Yunos (yellow card) 80'; Faris Ramli (yellow card) 90'; Irfan Fandi (yellow card) 90'	Attendance: 2,368; Referee: Ahmad A'Qashah

28 April 2017 Round 7	Home United (Singapore)	3–0	(Singapore) Geylang International	Bishan Stadium
	Song Ui-young 35'; Stipe Plazibat 81' (pen.); Khairul Nizam 90+4' (pen.)		Safirul Sulaiman (yellow card) 15'; Yuki Ichikawa (yellow card) 81'; Stanley Ng (yellow card) 85' (yellow card) 90+4' (yellow-red card); Anders Eric Aplin (red card) 90'	Attendance: 1,627; Referee: Sukhbir Singh

12 May 2017 Round 8	Tampines Rovers (Singapore)	3–2	(Singapore) Home United	Jalan Besar Stadium
	Khairul Amri 31'; Shakir Hamzah 41'; Daniel Bennett 44'; Fazli Ayob (yellow card) 18'; Son Yong Chan (yellow card) 62'; Yasir Hanapi (yellow card) 67'; Shakir Hamzah (yellow card) 85'; Zulfadmi Suzliman (yellow card) 90'		Amiruldin Asraf 13' 82'; Song Ui-young (yellow card) 17'; Shamil Sharif (yellow card) 89'	Attendance: 1,223; Referee: G Letchman

21 May 2017 Round 9	Young Lions FC (Singapore)	1–2	(Singapore) Home United	Jalan Besar Stadium
	Muhelmy Suhaimi 58' (yellow card) 41'; Joshua Pereira (yellow card) 77'		Faris Ramli (penalty missed) 7 Stipe Plazibat 12'; Khairul Nizam 49'; Adam Swandi (yellow card) 44'; Shamil Sharif (yellow card) 77'; Abdil Qaiyyim (yellow card) 84'	Attendance: 1,587; Referee: Farhad Mohamed

25 May 2017 Round 10	Home United (Singapore)	9–3	Brunei DPMM	Bishan Stadium
	Faris Ramli 21' 30' 45' 59'; Stipe Plazibat 33' 36'; Khairul Nizam 41'; Adam Swandi 49'; Song Ui-young 56'; Izzdin Shafiq (yellow card) 90'		Rafael Ramazotti 50'; Shahrazen Said 64'; Adi Said 64' 82'	Attendance: 1,801; Referee: W Ravisanthiran

23 June 2017 Round 11	Albirex Niigata (S) (Singapore)	0–2	(Singapore) Home United	Jalan Besar Stadium
	Yasutaka Yanagi (red card) 65'; Ryota Nakai (yellow card) 90'		Stipe Plazibat 32' 90+4' (pen.); Abdil Qaiyyim (yellow card) 24'; Izzdin Shafiq (yellow card) 84'	Attendance: 2,717; Referee: Muhd Taqi

30 June 2017 Round 12	Home United (Singapore)	2–3	(Singapore) Hougang United	Jalan Besar Stadium
	Stipe Plazibat 35'; Khairul Nizam 49'; Hariss Harun (yellow card) 37'; Irfan Fandi (yellow card) 64'		Nazrul Nazari 33' 40' (yellow card) 84'; Fareez Farhan 83'; Lionel Tan (yellow card) 65'	Attendance: 1,949; Referee: G Letchman

3 July 2017 Round 13	Balestier Khalsa (Singapore)	1–2	(Singapore) Home United	Toa Payoh Stadium
	Raihan Rahman 51' (pen.); Ahmad Syahir (yellow card) 38'; Nanda Linn Kyaw Chit (yellow card) 59'; Jonathan Tan (yellow card) 67'; Shah Hirul (yellow card) 68'; Zaiful Nizam (yellow card) 77'; Hanafi Salleh (red card) 84'; Kyaw Zayar Win (red card) 90'		Khairul Nizam 79'; Stipe Plazibat 85' (pen.); Amiruldin Asraf (yellow card) 25'; Irfan Fandi (yellow card) 46'; Sirina Camara (yellow card) 66' (yellow card) 66' (yellow-red card)	Referee: Farhad Mohamed

25 July 2017 Round 14	Home United (Singapore)	1–1	(Singapore) Warriors FC	Jalan Besar Stadium
	Irfan Fandi 12'; Hariss Harun (yellow card) 79'; Haziq Azman (yellow card) 85'		Shahril Ishak 45' (pen.); Baihakki Khaizan (yellow card) 25'; Syaqir Sulaiman (yellow card) 53'; Ho Wai Loon (yellow card) 25'; Kento Fukuda (yellow card) 83'	Attendance: 1,592; Referee: Sukhbir Singh

23 September 2017 Round 15 (Rescheduled)	Geylang International (Singapore)	1–3	(Singapore) Home United	Jalan Besar Stadium
	Shawal Anuar 90'; Victor Coto (yellow card) 88'		Adam Swandi 55'; Stipe Plazibat 86'; Shamil Sharif 90' (yellow card) 67'	Referee: W Ravisanthiran

23 October 2017 Round 16 (Rescheduled)	Home United (Singapore)	0–2	(Singapore) Tampines Rovers	Bishan Stadium
	Irfan Fandi (yellow card) 65'; Stipe Plazibat (yellow card) 80'; Abdil Qaiyyim (yellow card) 90'		Ryutaro Megumi 13', 55'; Irwan Shah (yellow card) 40'	Referee: G Letchman

8 September 2017 Round 17	Brunei DPMM FC	1–4	(Singapore) Home United	Hassanal Bolkiah National Stadium
	Ramazotti 30' (yellow card) 45'; Haizul Rani (yellow card) 32'; Hazwan Hamzah (yellow card) 44' (yellow card) 62' (yellow-red card); Azwan Ali (yellow card) 57'; Vincent Salas (red card) 90'	Report	Faris 15', 38'; Plazibat 19' (pen.); Nizam 78'; Abdil Qaiyyim (yellow card) 22'; Sufianto Salleh (yellow card) 73'; Khairul Nizam (yellow card) 82'	Attendance: 592; Referee: Nathan Chan

19 September 2017 Round 18	Home United (Singapore)	1–1	(Singapore) Albirex Niigata (S)	Bishan Stadium
	Adam Swandi 72'; Faris Ramli (yellow card) 40'; Song Uiyoung (yellow card) 77'		Naofumi Tanaka 3'	Attendance: 2,258; Referee: Muhd Taqi

15 October 2017 Round 19 (Rescheduled)	Hougang United (Singapore)	0–2	(Singapore) Home United	Hougang Stadium
	Fabian Kwok (yellow card) 88'		Abdil Qaiyyim 55'; Stipe Plazibat 69'; Anumanthan Kumar (yellow card) 46'; Izzdin Shafiq (yellow card) 89'	Attendance: 901; Referee: G Letchman

20 October 2017 Round 20	Home United (Singapore)	2–0	(Singapore) Balestier Khalsa	Jalan Besar Stadium
	Stipe Plazibat 24', 26'		Raihan Rahman (yellow card) 47'; Tajeli Salamat (yellow card) 63'; Fariz Faizal (yellow card) 69'	Referee: Farhad Mohamed

27 October 2017 Round 21	Warriors FC (Singapore)	2–1	(Singapore) Home United	Choa Chu Kang Stadium
	Andrei Ciolacu 27' (yellow card) 90'; Suria Prakash 36'; Ho Wai Loon (yellow card) 28'; Kento Fukuda (yellow card) 90'		Anumanthan Kumar 34'; Hariss Harun (yellow card) 49'; Hassan Sunny (yellow card) 90'	Referee: Farhad Mohamed

31 October 2017 Round 22	Home United (Singapore)	4–0	(Singapore) Young Lions	Bishan Stadium
	Adam Swandi 33'; Faris Ramli 40'; Irfan Fandi 74'; Stipe Plazibat 90'

4 November 2017 Round 23	Home United (Singapore)	2–1	(Singapore) Geylang International	Bishan Stadium
	Stipe Plazibat 33'; Faris Ramli 70'; Shamil Sharif (yellow card) 77'; Aqhari Abdullah (yellow card) 90+3'		Gabriel Quak 46'; Víctor Coto Ortega (yellow card) 12'; Nor Azli Yusoff (yellow card) 31'; Isa Halim (yellow card) 34'; Faritz Abdul Hameed (yellow card) 37'; Anders Eric Aplin (yellow card) 73'	Referee: Jansen Foo

18 November 2017 Round 24	Tampines Rovers (Singapore)	0–0	(Singapore) Home United	Our Tampines Hub
	Shannon Stephen (yellow card) 47'; Madhu Mohana (yellow card) 73'; Ismadi Mukhtar (yellow card) 85'; Son Yong Chan (yellow card) 87'		Faris Ramli (yellow card) 37'; Stipe Plazibat (yellow card) 52'	Referee: G Letchman

Pos	Team	Pld	W	D	L	GF	GA	GD	Pts	Qualification
1	(Japan) Albirex Niigata (S) (Note: The two foreign clubs – Albirex Niigata (S) and DPMM FC – as well as the Football Association of Singapore (FAS) under-21 team, Young Lions, are not eligible for any AFC competition spots.) (C)	24	20	2	2	70	16	+54	62	
2	Tampines Rovers	24	17	3	4	48	20	+28	54	Qualification to AFC Champions League Preliminary Round 1 or AFC Cup Group Stage
3	Home United	24	15	5	4	58	26	+32	50	Qualification to AFC Cup Group Stage
4	Geylang International	24	11	3	10	32	37	−5	36	
5	Warriors FC	24	9	7	8	33	36	−3	34	

Source: S.League
Rules for classification: 1) points; 2) goal difference; 3) number of goals scored; 4) number of wins
(C) Champions

=== Singapore Cup ===
Win Draw Loss

==== Quarter-final ====
13 August 2017 Quarter-final Leg 1	Brunei DPMM	1–3	(Singapore) Home United	Jalan Besar Stadium
	Rafael Ramazotti 60'; Hanif Hamir (yellow card) 24'		Juma'at Jantan 69'; Faris Ramli 72', 84'; Christopher Van Huizen (yellow card) 36'	Referee: Sukhbir Singh

16 August 2017 Quarter-final Leg 2	Home United (Singapore)	3–1	Brunei DPMM	Bishan Stadium
	Faris Ramli 64'; Iqram Rifqi 86'; Juma'at Jantan 90'		Helmi Zambin 48'	Referee: Nathan Chan

Home United won 6–2 on aggregate.

==== Semi-final ====
27 September 2017 Semi-final Leg 1	Albirex Niigata (S) (Japan)	3–1	(Singapore) Home United	Jurong East Stadium
	Ryota Nakai 4'; Hiroyoshi Kamata 58'; Kento Nagasaki 76'; Yasutaka Yanagi (yellow card) 27'; Tomoki Menda (yellow card) 78'		Faris Ramli 18' (yellow card) 34'; Juma'at Jantan (yellow card) 51'; Song Uiyoung (yellow card) 69'; Irfan Fandi (yellow card) 75'; Stipe Plazibat (penalty missed) 27	Referee: Ahmad A'Qashah

30 September 2017 Semi-final Leg 2	Home United (Singapore)	1–2	(Japan) Albirex Niigata (S)	Bishan Stadium
	Faris Ramli 45' (pen.); Abdil Qaiyyim (yellow card) 42'; Adam Swandi (yellow card) 61'		Kento Nagasaki 83'; Takuya Akiyama 88' (yellow card) 45'

Home United lost 2–5 on aggregate.

==== 3rd/4th place ====
25 November 2017 3rd/4th place	Home United (Singapore)	1–0	(Singapore) Hougang United	Jalan Besar Stadium
	Amiruldin Asraf 21'			Referee: Farhad Mohd

=== Singapore TNP League Cup ===
Pos	Team	Pld	W	D	L	GF	GA	GD	Pts	Qualification
1	Albirex Niigata (S)	3	2	1	0	0	0	0	7	Advance to semi-final
2	Warriors	3	1	1	1	6	7	−1	4	Advance to semi-final
3	Hougang United	3	0	3	0	3	3	0	3	
4	Home United	3	0	1	2	4	6	−2	1	

Source: S.League

==== Group matches ====
Win Draw Loss

7 July 2017 Group Stage M1	Warriors FC (Singapore)	4–3	(Singapore) Home United	Choa Chu Kang Stadium
	Andrei Ciolacu 22' (pen.) 64' 68'; Jordan Webb 76'; Hyrulnizam Juma'at (yellow card) 34'; Fazli Jaffar (yellow card) 70' (yellow card) 79' (yellow-red card); Shaiful Esah (yellow card) 90'		Stipe Plazibat 6'; Iqram Rifqi 15'; Hariss Harun 34' (pen.); Juma'at Jantan (yellow card) 21'	Referee: Muhd Taqi

10 July 2017 Group Stage M2	Home United (Singapore)	1–1	(Singapore) Hougang United	Jalan Besar Stadium
	Stipe Plazibat 39'; Abdil Qaiyyim (yellow card) 25'; Afiq Yunos (yellow card) 90' (yellow card) 90' (yellow-red card); Khairul Nizam (red card) 90'		Fairoz Hasan 36'; Afiq Noor (yellow card) 53'; Justin Hui (yellow card) 70'; Delwinder Singh (yellow card) 90'	Referee: Farhad Mohd

13 July 2017 Group Stage M3	Home United (Singapore)	0–1	(Singapore) Albirex Niigata (S)	Jalan Besar Stadium
	Hariss Harun (yellow card) 26'; Sufianto Salleh (yellow card) 57'		Tsubasa Sano 53'	Referee: G Letchman

=== AFC Cup ===
Win Draw Loss

==== Qualifying play-off ====
30 January 2017 Play off round 1st leg	Phnom Penh Crown (Cambodia)	3–4	(Singapore) Home United	Phnom Penh
	Futa Nakamura 45+2'; Keo Sokngon 83'; Shane Booysen 90+3'	Report	Faris Ramli 33' (pen.) 35'; Stipe Plazibat 70'; Izzdin Shafiq 85'	Stadium: RSN Stadium; Attendance: 1,700; Referee: Pranjal Banerji, India

7 February 2017 Play off round 2nd leg	Home United (Singapore)	3–0	(Cambodia) Phnom Penh Crown	Singapore
	Adam Swandi 14'; Stipe Plazibat 71'; Amiruldin Asraf 81'	Report		Stadium: Jalan Besar Stadium; Attendance: 642; Referee: Takuto Okabe Japan

==== Group stage ====
Pos	Team	Pld	W	D	L	GF	GA	GD	Pts	Qualification	HOM	TQN	YAD
1	(Singapore) Home United	4	3	0	1	12	8	+4	9	Zonal semi-finals	—	3–2	4–1
2	(Vietnam) Than Quảng Ninh	4	1	1	2	10	9	+1	4 (Note: Head-to-head results: Than Quảng Ninh 1–1 Yadanarbon, Yadanarbon 0–3 Than Quảng Ninh.)		4–5	—	1–1
3	(Myanmar) Yadanarbon	4	1	1	2	3	8	−5	4		1–0	0–3	—

Source: AFC
Rules for classification: Group stage tiebreakers
Notes:

22 February 2017 Match Day 1	Yadanarbon (Myanmar)	1–0	(Singapore) Home United	Mandalay
	Aung Thu 45+2'	Report		Stadium: Bahtoo Stadium; Referee: Muhammad Nazmi Nasaruddin Malaysia

8 March 2017 Match Day 2	Home United (Singapore)	Cancelled	(Laos) Lanexang United	Singapore
				Stadium: Jalan Besar Stadium

14 March 2017 Match Day 3	Home United (Singapore)	3–2	(Vietnam) Than Quảng Ninh	Singapore
	Song Ui-young 3', 84' (yellow card) 44'; Faris Ramli 58'; Irfan Fandi (yellow card) 38'		Patiyo Tambwe 32'; Vũ Minh Tuấn 40'; Mạc Hồng Quân (yellow card) 44,76' (yellow-red card); Dương Văn Khoa (yellow card) 54'; Phạm Nguyên Sa (yellow card) 69'	Stadium: Jalan Besar Stadium; Attendance: 1,971; Referee: Omar Mubarak Mazaroua Al Yaqoubi Oman

5 April 2017 Match Day 4	Than Quảng Ninh (Vietnam)	4–5	(Singapore) Home United	Hanoi
	Juma'at Jantan 36' (o.g.); Bùi Văn Hiếu 44'; Vũ Minh Tuấn 78'; Nghiêm Xuân Tú 92'; Nguyễn Thanh Hiền (yellow card) 19'		Khairul Nizam 10' (yellow card) 55'; Stipe Plazibat	Stadium: Mỹ Đình National Stadium; Attendance: 2,860; Referee: Muhammad Nazmi Nasaruddin (Malaysia)
	Penalties
	4–5

18 April 2017 Match Day 5	Home United (Singapore)	4–1	(Myanmar) Yadanarbon	Singapore
	Afiq Yunos 12'; Faris Ramli 16' (pen.); Irfan Fandi 26'; Adam Swandi 72'; Stipe Plazibat (yellow card) 32'; Sirina Camara (red card)	Report	Sithu Aung 45+3'; Hlaing Bo Bo (yellow card) 15'; Ye Ko Oo (yellow card) 21,90+2' (yellow-red card); Yan Paing (yellow card) 33' (red card) 36'; Pyae Lyan Aung (yellow card) 39'; Ye Yint Htun (yellow card) 82'; Thet Naing (red card) 90'	Stadium: Jalan Besar Stadium; Attendance: 1,535; Referee: Mooud Bonyadifar (Iran)

2 May 2017 Match Day 6	Lanexang United (Laos)	Cancelled	(Singapore) Home United	Vientiane
				Stadium: Lanexang Stadium

==== Knockout stage ====
16 May 2017 Zonal Semi-final 1st leg	Global FC (Philippines)	2–2	(Singapore) Home United	Manila
	Darryl Roberts 15'; Amani Aguinaldo 53' (yellow card) 71' (yellow card) 76' (yellow-red card); Kemy Agustien (yellow card) 88'		Adam Swandi 33'; Stipe Plazibat 90+5'; Afiq Yunos (yellow card) 63'	Stadium: Rizal Memorial Stadium; Referee: Wang Di, China

30 May 2017 Zonal Semi-final 2nd leg	Home United (Singapore)	3–2 (Home United won 5–4 on agg.)	(Philippines) Global FC	Kallang
	Song Ui-young 36' (yellow card) 21'; Stipe Plazibat 89' 90+4'; Irfan Fandi (yellow card) 14'	Report	Kemy Agustien 5' (pen.); Shu Sasaki 49'; Dennis Villanueva (red card) 71'	Stadium: Jalan Besar Stadium; Attendance: 1,370; Referee: Ammar Al-Jeneibi, United Arab Emirates

2 August 2017 Zonal Final 1st leg	Home United (Singapore)	2–1	(Philippines) Ceres–Negros	Kallang
	Stipe Plazibat 11' (pen.); Hariss Harun 84'; Sirina Camara (yellow card) 19'; Izzdin Shafiq (yellow card) 59'; Irfan Fandi (yellow card) 77'		Martin Steuble 45+3'; Jeffrey Christiaens (yellow card) 7'; Manuel Ott (yellow card) 38'; Súper (yellow card) 74'	Stadium: Jalan Besar Stadium; Referee: Hiroyuki Kimura Japan

9 August 2017 Zonal Final 2nd leg	Ceres–Negros (Philippines)	2–0 (Ceres–Negros won 3–2 agg.)	(Singapore) Home United	Bacolod
	OJ Porteria 2'; Manuel Ott 42'; Fernando Rodríguez (penalty missed) 13; Kevin Ingreso (yellow card) 45+3'; Manuel Herrera López (yellow card) 68'; Bienvenido Marañón (yellow card) 85'		Afiq Yunos (yellow card) 41'; Khairul Nizam (yellow card) 64'; Sirina Camara (yellow card) 90+1'	Stadium: Panaad Park and Stadium; Referee: Hettikankanamge Chrishantha, Sri Lanka
