= 2018 Yadanarbon FC season =

Yadanarbon
2018 season
- Owner: (Myanmar) Dr. Sai Sam Tun
- Manager: (Myanmar) Mr. Aung Kyaw Moe
- Stadium: Mandalarthiri Stadium
- Top goalscorer: Sithu Aung (4 goals)

== Sponsorship ==
Period	Sportswear	Sponsor
2018	(Thailand) FBT	(Myanmar) Alpine

== Club ==
=== Coaching staff ===
Position	Staff
General Manager	(Myanmar) Aung Tun Oo
Head coach	(Myanmar) Mr. Aung Kyaw Moe
Assistant coach	(Myanmar) U Zaw Lay Aung
Assistant coach	(Myanmar) Mr. Yan Paing

Source: Yadanarbon FC

=== Other information ===
Owner	(Myanmar) Dr. Sai Sam Tun
Ground (capacity and dimensions)	Mandalarthiri Stadium (30,000 / 103x67 metres)
Training Ground	Bahtoo Stadium

== League table ==
Below is the league table for 2018 season.

Pos	Team	Pld	W	D	L	GF	GA	GD	Pts	Qualification or relegation
1	Yadanarbon	1	1	0	0	5	2	+3	3	AFC Champions League preliminary round 2 or AFC Cup group stage
2	Yangon United	1	1	0	0	2	1	+1	3	
3	GFA	1	0	1	0	1	1	+0	1	

== 2018 Players squad ==
Note: Flags indicate national team as defined under FIFA eligibility rules; some limited exceptions apply. Players may hold more than one non-FIFA nationality.

No.	Pos.	Nation	Player
1	GK	MYA	Chan Nyein Kyaw
3	DF	MYA	Thein Than Win
4	DF	MYA	Zaw Ye Tun
5	DF	MYA	Ye Yint Aung
7	MF	MYA	Ye Ko Oo (Vice Captain)
8	MF	MYA	Bi Bi
9	DF	MYA	Shine Thura
10	MF	MYA	Sithu Aung
11	FW	MYA	Thet Naing
13	DF	MYA	Ko Ko Hein
14	DF	MYA	Kyaw Thet Oo
15	DF	MYA	Saw Soe Moe Tun
16	MF	MYA	Myo Ko Tun
17	MF	MYA	Myo Zaw Oo
18	GK	MYA	Pyae Sone Chit

No.	Pos.	Nation	Player
19	MF	MYA	Hlaing Bo Bo
20	FW	MYA	Win Naing Tun
21	MF	MYA	Pyae Sone Naing
22	DF	MYA	Aung Wunna Soe
23	DF	MYA	Hein Nay San
24	MF	MYA	Aung Thura
26	FW	MYA	Ye Yint Htun
27	MF	MYA	Myat Kaung Khant
29	FW	MYA	Win Naing Soe
30	DF	MYA	Nay Myo Aung
31	MF	MYA	Aung Naing Win
44	DF	MYA	Tluanghup Thang
56	GK	MYA	Pyae Lyan Aung
