= 2017 Yadanarbon FC season =

Yadanarbon
2017 season
- Owner: (Myanmar) Dr. Sai Sam Tun
- Manager: (Belgium) Rene Desaeyere
- Stadium: Mandalarthiri Stadium
- Top goalscorer: League: Aung Thu (4 goals); All: Aung Thu (4 goals)

== Sponsorship ==
| Period | Sportswear | Sponsor |
|---|---|---|
| 2017 | (Thailand) FBT | (Myanmar) Alpine |

== Club ==
=== Coaching staff ===
| Position | Staff |
|---|---|
| General Manager | (Myanmar) Aung Tun Oo |
| Head coach | (Belgium) Desaeyere Rene Oscar |
| Assistant coach | (Myanmar) U Zaw Lay Aung |
| Assistant coach | (Myanmar) Aung Kyaw Moe |

Source: Yadanarbon FC

=== Other information ===
| Owner | (Myanmar) Dr. Sai Sam Tun |
| Ground (capacity and dimensions) | Mandalarthiri Stadium (30,000 / 103x67 metres) |
| Training Ground | Bahtoo Stadium |

== League table ==
Below is the league table for 2017 season.

| Pos | Team | Pld | W | D | L | GF | GA | GD | Pts | Qualification or relegation |
|---|---|---|---|---|---|---|---|---|---|---|
| 1 | Yangon United | 11 | 10 | 1 | 0 | 25 | 5 | +20 | 31 | AFC Champions League preliminary round 2 or AFC Cup group stage |
| 2 | Shan United | 11 | 8 | 1 | 2 | 16 | 5 | +11 | 25 | |
| 3 | Yadanarbon | 11 | 7 | 3 | 1 | 18 | 11 | +7 | 24 | |
| 4 | Ayeyawady United | 11 | 5 | 3 | 3 | 15 | 9 | +6 | 18 | |

== 2017 AFC Cup ==
| Season | Competition | Round | | Club | Score |
|---|---|---|---|---|---|
| 2017 | AFC Cup | Group Stage | (Singapore) | Home United | (H 1–0, A 1–4) |
| 2017 | AFC Cup | Group Stage | (Vietnam) | Than Quảng Ninh | (H ?–? , A 1–1) |

== 2017 Players squad ==
Note: Flags indicate national team as defined under FIFA eligibility rules; some limited exceptions apply. Players may hold more than one non-FIFA nationality.

| No. | Pos. | Nation | Player |
|---|---|---|---|
| 1 | GK | MYA | Yan Aung Lin |
| 2 | DF | CMR | Biassi Nyakwe William |
| 3 | MF | MYA | Thein Than Win |
| 4 | DF | MYA | Zaw Ye Tun |
| 5 | DF | MYA | Sithu Aung |
| 6 | DF | MYA | Ye Yint Aung |
| 7 | MF | MYA | Ye Ko Oo (Vice Captain) |
| 8 | MF | MYA | Aung Thu |
| 9 | FW | MYA | Yan Paing (Captain) |
| 11 | MF | MYA | Thet Naing |
| 15 | FW | MYA | Taryar Thint Thein |
| 16 | MF | MYA | Myo Ko Tun |
| 17 | MF | MYA | Myo Zaw Oo |

| No. | Pos. | Nation | Player |
|---|---|---|---|
| 18 | GK | MYA | Pyae Sone Chit |
| 19 | MF | MYA | Hlaing Bo Bo |
| 21 | MF | MYA | Sitt Mone |
| 23 | DF | MYA | Hein Nay San |
| 24 | DF | MYA | Kyaw Thet Oo |
| 25 | GK | MYA | Pyae Lyan Aung |
| 26 | FW | MYA | Ye Yint Htun |
| 28 | DF | MYA | Ko Ko Hein |
| 29 | FW | MYA | Win Naing Soe |
| 30 | DF | MYA | Nay Myo Aung |
| 31 | MF | MYA | Aung Naing Win |
