= 2011 AFC President's Cup =

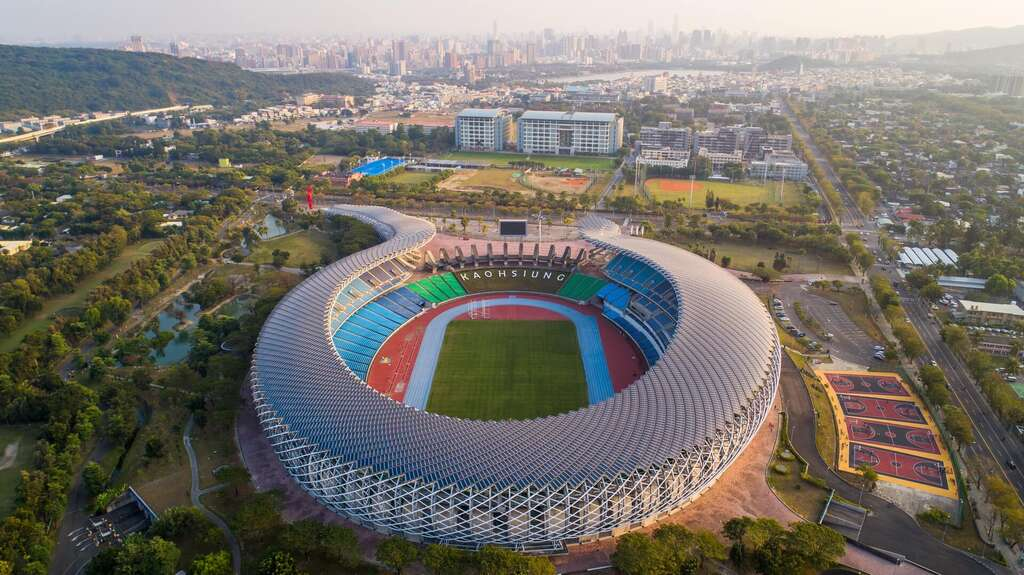
- Kaohsiung National Stadium in Kaohsiung hosted the final

Tournament details
- Host country: Taiwan
- Dates: 20 April – 25 May (group stage); 19–25 September (final stage)
- Teams: 6 (final stage); 12 (total) (from 12 associations)

Final positions
- Champions: (Chinese Taipei) Taipower FC (1st title)
- Runners-up: (Cambodia) Phnom Penh Crown

Tournament statistics
- Matches played: 25
- Goals scored: 90 (3.6 per match)
- Attendance: 58,208 (2,328 per match)
- Top scorer(s): (Chinese Taipei) Ho Ming-tsan (6 goals)
- Best player: (Chinese Taipei) Chen Po-liang

The 2011 AFC President's Cup was the seventh edition of the AFC President's Cup, a football competition organized by the Asian Football Confederation (AFC) for clubs from "emerging countries" in Asia.

Teams from 12 member associations competed. In the qualifying stage, the 12 teams were divided into three groups of four teams each, and the top two teams from each group qualified for the six-team finals to be played at a centralised venue. In the final stage, the qualified six teams were divided into two groups of three teams each. The winners from each group met in the final for the title.

TaiPOWER FC became the first Taiwanese team to win the AFC President's Cup with a 3–2 win over Phnom Penh Crown from Cambodia in the final.

== Venues ==
Phnom Penh	Yangon	
Phnom Penh Olympic Stadium	Thuwunna Stadium	Bogyoke Aung San Stadium
Capacity: 70,000	Capacity: 32,000	Capacity: 40,000
Kaohsiung	Kathmandu	
Kaohsiung National Stadium	Dasarath Rangasala Stadium	Halchowk Stadium
Capacity: 55,000	Capacity: 17,800	Capacity: 3,500

== Qualifying teams ==
Palestinian Authority clubs began to play in the AFC President's Cup from 2011 onwards.

Association	Team	Qualifying method	App	Last App
Bangladesh	Abahani Limited	2009–10 Bangladesh League champions	4th	2010
Bhutan	Yeedzin	2010 A-Division champions	2nd	2009
Cambodia	Phnom Penh Crown	2010 Cambodian League champions	3rd	2009
Chinese Taipei	Taipower FC	2010 Intercity Football League champions	4th	2009
Kyrgyzstan	Neftchi Kochkor-Ata	2010 Kyrgyzstan League champions	1st	none
Myanmar	Yadanarbon	2010 Myanmar National League champions	2nd	2010
Nepal	Nepal Police Club	2010 Martyr's Memorial A-Division League champions	4th	2009
Pakistan	WAPDA	2010 Pakistan Premier League champions	4th	2009
Palestine	Jabal Al Mukaber	2009–10 West Bank Premier League champions	1st	none
Sri Lanka	Don Bosco	2010–11 Sri Lanka Football Premier League champions	1st	none
Tajikistan	Istiqlol	2010 Tajik League champions	1st	none
Turkmenistan	FC Balkan	2010 Turkmenistan League champions	1st	none

== Group stage ==
Location of teams of the 2011 AFC President's Cup.
Group A (played in Cambodia)
Group B (played in Myanmar)
Group C (played in Nepal)

The draw for the group stage was held on 14 March 2011, 15:00 UTC+08:00, at AFC House, Kuala Lumpur. The 12 teams were divided into three groups of four teams each. The group matches were scheduled to be played from 13 to 31 May 2011; however, matches of Group C were played from 20 to 24 April 2011.

All groups were played in a single round-robin format at a centralized venue. The top two teams from each group qualified for the final stage. The clubs are ranked according to points and tie breakers are in following order:

1. Greater number of points obtained in the group matches between the teams concerned;
2. Goal difference resulting from the group matches between the teams concerned;
3. Greater number of goals scored in the group matches between the teams concerned;
4. Goal difference in all the group matches;
5. Greater number of goals scored in all the group matches;
6. Kicks from the penalty mark if only two teams are involved and they are both on the field of play;
7. Fewer score calculated according to the number of yellow and red cards received in the group matches; (1 point for each yellow card, 3 points for each red card as a consequence of two yellow cards, 3 points for each direct red card, 4 points for each yellow card followed by a direct red card)
8. Drawing of lots.

=== Group A ===
Pos	Team	Pld	W	D	L	GF	GA	GD	Pts	Qualification
1	(Kyrgyzstan) Neftchi Kochkor-Ata	3	3	0	0	5	0	+5	9	Advanced to Final stage
2	(Cambodia) Phnom Penh Crown	3	2	0	1	4	1	+3	6	Advanced to Final stage
3	(Bangladesh) Abahani Limited	3	1	0	2	4	4	0	3	
4	(Sri Lanka) Don Bosco	3	0	0	3	1	9	−8	0	

- All matches were held in Cambodia.
- All times are Indochina Time (ICT) – UTC+07:00
21 May 2011
13:30

Neftchi Kochkor-Ata (Kyrgyzstan)	2–0	(Bangladesh) Abahani Limited
Adzhiniiazov 10'; Pavlov 33'	Report

Olympic Stadium, Phnom Penh
Attendance: 3,000
Referee: Strebre Delovski (Australia)
21 May 2011
16:00

Phnom Penh Crown (Cambodia)	3–0	(Sri Lanka) Don Bosco
Njoku 25'; Sokumpheak 66'; Chaya 67'	Report

Olympic Stadium, Phnom Penh
Attendance: 6,000
Referee: Vladislav Tseytlin (Uzbekistan)

23 May 2011
13:30

Don Bosco (Sri Lanka)	0–2	(Kyrgyzstan) Neftchi Kochkor-Ata
	Report	Pavlov 24'; Baldinov 65'

Olympic Stadium, Phnom Penh
Attendance: 3,000
Referee: Pratap Singh (India)
23 May 2011
16:00

Abahani Limited (Bangladesh)	0–1	(Cambodia) Phnom Penh Crown
	Report	Chaya 80'

Olympic Stadium, Phnom Penh
Attendance: 6,500
Referee: Rustam Kholov (Tajikistan)

25 May 2011
13:30

Abahani Limited (Bangladesh)	4–1	(Sri Lanka) Don Bosco
Rony 17'; Ibrahim 51', 61', 81' (pen.)	Report	Arachchilage 15'

Olympic Stadium, Phnom Penh
Attendance: 1,000
Referee: Vladislav Tseytlin (Uzbekistan)
25 May 2011
16:00

Phnom Penh Crown (Cambodia)	0–1	(Kyrgyzstan) Neftchi Kochkor-Ata
	Report	Adjiniyazov 79'

Olympic Stadium, Phnom Penh
Attendance: 7,000
Referee: Strebre Delovski (Australia)

=== Group B ===
Pos	Team	Pld	W	D	L	GF	GA	GD	Pts	Qualification
1	(Tajikistan) Istiqlol	3	2	1	0	11	1	+10	7	Advanced to Final stage
2	(Myanmar) Yadanarbon	3	2	1	0	11	4	+7	7	Advanced to Final stage
3	(Palestine) Jabal Al Mukaber	3	1	0	2	10	6	+4	3	
4	(Bhutan) Yeedzin	3	0	0	3	0	21	−21	0	

- All matches were held in Myanmar.
- All times are Myanmar Standard Time (MST) – UTC+06:30
13 May 2011
15:30

Yadanarbon (Myanmar)	6–0	(Bhutan) Yeedzin
Yan Paing 4', 50'; Pai Soe 11', 15', 36'; Koné 40'	Report

Thuwunna Stadium, Yangon
Attendance: 4,000
Referee: Dmitriy Mashentsev (Kyrgyzstan)
13 May 2011
18:00

Istiqlol (Tajikistan)	2–0	(Palestine) Jabal Al Mukaber
Fatkhuloev 58'; Rabimov 89'	Report

Thuwunna Stadium, Yangon
Attendance: 1,500
Referee: Kim Jong-Hyeok (Korea Republic)

15 May 2011
15:30

Yeedzin (Bhutan)	0–8	(Tajikistan) Istiqlol
	Report	Fatkhuloev 16', 30'; Vasiev 24'; Tokhirov 56', 63', 70', 76'; Saburov 90+2'

Thuwunna Stadium, Yangon
Attendance: 1,200
Referee: Hettikamkanamge Perera (Sri Lanka)
15 May 2011
18:00

Jabal Al Mukaber (Palestine)	3–4	(Myanmar) Yadanarbon
Maraaba 8'; A. Aliwisat 27'; Al Amour 39'	Report	Hussein Hasan 41' (o.g.); Yan Paing 45+3', 58'; Pai Soe 90+4'

Thuwunna Stadium, Yangon
Attendance: 4,500
Referee: Hedayat Mombeni (Iran)

17 May 2011
15:30

Yadanarbon (Myanmar)	1–1	(Tajikistan) Istiqlol
Yan Paing 90+3' (pen.)	Report	Davronov 57'

Thuwunna Stadium, Yangon
Attendance: 6,000
Referee: Hettikamkanamge Perera (Sri Lanka)
17 May 2011
15:30

Jabal Al Mukaber (Palestine)	7–0	(Bhutan) Yeedzin
A. Aliwisat 2'; Halman 9'; S. Aliwisat 14'; Al Amour 33', 44'; Khatib 64'; Wadi 80'	Report

Bogyoke Aung San Stadium, Yangon
Attendance: 200
Referee: Dmitriy Mashentsev (Kyrgyzstan)

=== Group C ===
Pos	Team	Pld	W	D	L	GF	GA	GD	Pts	Qualification
1	(Chinese Taipei) Taipower FC	3	2	1	0	5	1	+4	7	Advanced to Final stage
2	(Turkmenistan) Balkan	3	2	1	0	4	1	+3	7	Advanced to Final stage
3	(Pakistan) WAPDA	3	1	0	2	2	4	−2	3	
4	Nepal Police Club	3	0	0	3	0	5	−5	0	

- All matches were held in Nepal.
- All times are Nepal Time (NPT) – UTC+05:45
20 April 2011
15:30

Nepal Police Club	0–2	(Pakistan) WAPDA
	Report	Mehmood 39'; Pathan 88'

Dasarath Rangasala Stadium, Kathmandu
Attendance: 3,000
Referee: Marai Al Awaji (Saudi Arabia)
20 April 2011
15:30

Taipower FC (Chinese Taipei)	1–1	(Turkmenistan) Balkan
Ho Ming-tsan 67'	Report	Alikperow 36'

Halchowk Stadium, Kathmandu
Attendance: 600
Referee: Ko Hyung-Jin (Korea Republic)

22 April 2011
15:30

WAPDA (Pakistan)	0–3	(Chinese Taipei) Taipower FC
	Report	Pan Kuao-kai 41'; Chen Yi-wei 55'; Ho Ming-tsan 65'

Halchowk Stadium, Kathmandu
Attendance: 350
Referee: Yadollah Jahanbazi (Iran)
22 April 2011
15:30

Balkan (Turkmenistan)	2–0	Nepal Police Club
Kuçerenkow 41'; Diwanow 52'	Report

Dasarath Rangasala Stadium, Kathmandu
Attendance: 1,000
Referee: Sgt Win Cho (Myanmar)

24 April 2011
15:30

Nepal Police Club	0–1	(Chinese Taipei) Taipower FC
	Report	Chiang Shih-lu 67'

Dasarath Rangasala Stadium, Kathmandu
Attendance: 1,000
Referee: Ko Hyung-Jin (Korea Republic)
24 April 2011
15:30

Balkan (Turkmenistan)	1–0	(Pakistan) WAPDA
Diwanow 31'	Report

Halchowk Stadium, Kathmandu
Attendance: 600
Referee: Marai Al Awaji (Saudi Arabia)

== Final stage ==
On 14 June 2011, the Organising Committee for the AFC President's Cup decided to award the hosting rights of the 2011 AFC President's Cup Finals to Chinese Taipei. The matches were played at the Kaohsiung National Stadium in Kaohsiung from 19 to 25 September 2011.

The draw for the final stage was held on 29 July 2011, 16:00 UTC+08:00, at AFC House, Kuala Lumpur, Malaysia. The six teams which qualified for the final stage were divided into two groups of three teams each, played in a single round-robin format. The winner from each group qualified for the single-match final to decide the title (extra time and penalty shootout would be used to decide the winner if necessary).

- All matches were held in Taiwan (Republic of China).
- All times are Taiwan Standard Time (TST) – UTC+08:00

=== Group A ===
Pos	Team	Pld	W	D	L	GF	GA	GD	Pts	Qualification
1	(Chinese Taipei) Taiwan Power Company	2	2	0	0	6	3	+3	6	Advanced to Final
2	(Turkmenistan) Balkan	2	0	1	1	4	5	−1	1	
3	(Tajikistan) Istiqlol	2	0	1	1	1	3	−2	1	

19 September 2011
19:00

Istiqlol (Tajikistan)	0–2	(Chinese Taipei) Taiwan Power Company
	Report	Chen Po-liang 39'; Chiang Shih-lu 41'

Kaohsiung National Stadium, Kaohsiung
Attendance: 1,435
Referee: Marai Al Awaji (Saudi Arabia)

21 September 2011
16:00

Balkan (Turkmenistan)	1–1	(Tajikistan) Istiqlol
Gurbani 23'	Report	Tokhirov 45+1'

Kaohsiung National Stadium, Kaohsiung
Attendance: 209
Referee: Akbar Bakhshi Zadeh (Iran)

23 September 2011
19:00

Taiwan Power Company (Chinese Taipei)	4–3	(Turkmenistan) Balkan
Ho Ming-tsan 57', 66' (pen.); Kuo Yin-hung 81'; Chen Po-liang 87'	Report	Gurbani 24', 25'; Garahanow 62'

Kaohsiung National Stadium, Kaohsiung
Attendance: 2,067
Referee: Kim Jong-Hyeok (Korea Republic)

=== Group B ===
Pos	Team	Pld	W	D	L	GF	GA	GD	Pts	Qualification
1	(Cambodia) Phnom Penh Crown	2	2	0	0	6	1	+5	6	Advanced to Final
2	(Kyrgyzstan) Neftchi Kochkor-Ata	2	1	0	1	9	4	+5	3	
3	(Myanmar) Yadanarbon	2	0	0	2	2	12	−10	0	

19 September 2011
16:00

Phnom Penh Crown (Cambodia)	2–1	(Kyrgyzstan) Neftchi Kochkor-Ata
Njoku 35'; Chaya 56'	Report	Alimov 79'

Kaohsiung National Stadium, Kaohsiung
Attendance: 118
Referee: Kim Jong-Hyeok (Korea Republic)

21 September 2011
19:00

Yadanarbon (Myanmar)	0–4	(Cambodia) Phnom Penh Crown
	Report	Njoku 3', 83'; Sokumpheak 22'; Sopanha 32'

Kaohsiung National Stadium, Kaohsiung
Attendance: 422
Referee: Mohammed Abdullah Hassan (UAE)

23 September 2011
16:00

Neftchi Kochkor-Ata (Kyrgyzstan)	8–2	(Myanmar) Yadanarbon
Pavlov 5', 73', 90+2'; Djamshidov 33', 87'; Dzhumataev 79', 90'; Dzhalilov 86'	Report	Pai Soe 35'; Rakhmanjonov 47' (o.g.)

Kaohsiung National Stadium, Kaohsiung
Attendance: 269
Referee: Akbar Bakhshi Zadeh (Iran)

=== Final ===
25 September 2011
19:00

Phnom Penh Crown (Cambodia)	2–3	(Chinese Taipei) Taiwan Power Company
Njoku 34'; Sovannrithy 82'	Report	Ho Ming-tsan 2', 47'; Chen Po-liang 67'

Kaohsiung National Stadium, Kaohsiung
Attendance: 3,238
Referee: Marai Al Awaji (Saudi Arabia)

Phnom Penh Crown	Taiwan Power Company

PHNOM PENH CROWN:
GK	1	(Cambodia) Peng Bunchay
DF	3	(Cambodia) Thul Sothearith	(yellow card) 52'
DF	4	(Cambodia) Tieng Tiny	(yellow card) 28'	(substituted off) 66'
DF	12	(Nigeria) Odion Obadin	(yellow card) 60'
DF	14	(Cambodia) Sun Sovannrithy	(red card) 90+4'
MF	8	(Cambodia) San Narith	(red card) 90+4'
MF	10	(Cambodia) Kouch Sokumpheak
MF	23	(Cambodia) Sun Sopanha		(substituted off) 79'
MF	27	(Cambodia) Khim Borey		(substituted off) 69'
FW	9	(Cambodia) Chan Chaya	(yellow card) 79' (yellow-red card) 90+4'
FW	20	(Nigeria) Kingsley Njoku
Substitutions:
DF	6	(Cambodia) Sok Sovan		(substituted on) 66'
FW	19	(Cambodia) Sok Pheng	(yellow card) 78'	(substituted on) 69'
MF	13	(Cambodia) Hong Ratana		(substituted on) 79'
Manager:
(England) David Booth

TAIWAN POWER COMPANY:
GK	1	(Chinese Taipei) Pan Wei-chih
DF	3	(Chinese Taipei) Tu Ming-feng
DF	5	(Chinese Taipei) Chen Yu-lin	(red card) 77'
DF	12	(Chinese Taipei) Chen Yi-wei		(substituted off) 87'
DF	15	(Chinese Taipei) Liang Chien-wei
DF	17	(Chinese Taipei) Lee Meng-chian
MF	7	(Chinese Taipei) Ho Ming-tsan		(substituted off) 73'
MF	10	(Chinese Taipei) Hung Kai-chun
MF	11	(Chinese Taipei) Feng Pao-hsing
MF	26	(Chinese Taipei) Chen Po-liang
FW	9	(Chinese Taipei) Kuo Yin-hung
Substitutions:
DF	16	(Chinese Taipei) Tsai Sheng-an		(substituted on) 73'
FW	23	(Chinese Taipei) Huang Chiu-ching		(substituted on) 87'
Manager:
(Chinese Taipei) Chen Kuei-jen

Assistant referees:
Nassir Al Mudhaffar (Saudi Arabia)
Mohamed Salman (Bahrain)
Fourth official:
Mohammed Hassan Mohamed (United Arab Emirates)

2011 AFC President's Cup

1st title

== Awards ==
The following awards were given for the 2011 AFC President's Cup:

- Most Valuable Player Award: (Chinese Taipei) Chen Po-liang (Taiwan Power Company)
- Top Scorer: (Chinese Taipei) Ho Ming-tsan (Taiwan Power Company)
- Fair Play Award: (Kyrgyzstan) Neftchi Kochkor-Ata

== Top scorers ==
Rank	Player	Club	GS1	GS2	GS3	FG1	FG2	F	Total
1	(Chinese Taipei) Ho Ming-tsan	(Chinese Taipei) Taiwan Power Company	1	1			2	2	6
2	(Myanmar) Yan Paing	(Myanmar) Yadanarbon	2	2	1				5
2	(Myanmar) Pai Soe	(Myanmar) Yadanarbon	3	1			1		5
2	(Tajikistan) Farkhod Tokhirov	(Tajikistan) Istiqlol		4			1		5
2	(Uzbekistan) Pavel Pavlov	(Kyrgyzstan) Neftchi Kochkor-Ata	1	1			3		5
2	(Nigeria) Kingsley Njoku	(Cambodia) Phnom Penh Crown	1			1	2	1	5

== See also ==
- 2011 AFC Champions League
- 2011 AFC Cup
- List of sporting events in Taiwan
