= 2009 Bhutan A-Division =

A-Division (Bhutan)
- Season: 2009
- Champions: Druk Star
- AFC President's Cup: Druk Stars
- Matches played: 49
- Goals scored: 321 (6.55 per match)
- Biggest home win: Yeedzin 20-0 Druk Athletic
- Biggest away win: Druk Athletic 1-16 Yeedzin
- Highest scoring: Yeedzin 20-0 Druk Athletic
- Longest unbeaten run: Druk Stars (13 matches)

The 2009 season of the Bhutanese A-Division was the fifteenth recorded season of top-flight football in Bhutan. The league was won by Druk Star FC, their second title. They qualified as Bhutan's representatives in the 2010 AFC President's Cup.

== League table ==
Teams played each other on a home and away basis, there was no relegation play-off this season, the bottom two teams were relegated automatically. Ngangpa were promoted from the B-Division for the 2010 season.

Pos	Team	Pld	W	D	L	GF	GA	GD	Pts	Qualification or relegation
1	Druk Stars (C)	13	10	3	0	72	12	+60	33	Qualified for 2010 AFC President's Cup
2	Yeedzin	13	9	1	3	82	19	+63	28	
3	Druk Pol	13	6	5	2	45	19	+26	23	
4	Choden (Note: Choden FC are Bhutan national U-19 team.)	13	6	4	3	41	17	+24	22	
5	Transport United	13	3	5	5	35	43	−8	14	
6	Druk Athletic	13	1	1	11	12	113	−101	4	
7	Rigzung (R)	13	1	0	12	18	82	−64	3	Relegated to 2010 B-Division
8	Royal Bhutan Army (Note: Royal Bhutan Army withdrew after playing 6 matches and their matches in the second half of the season were cancelled.) (R)	7	3	1	3	16	16	0	10	Relegated to 2010 B-Division

Updated to match(es) played on 27 August 2010. Source:
Rules for classification: 1) points; 2) goal difference; 3) number of goals scored.
(C) Champions; (R) Relegated

== Results ==
Team (Note: The notion of home and away fixtures in the A-Division is moot as all games are played at Changlimithang Stadium. As such, for the purpose of this table, the first result chronologically has been deemed that team's "home" game and the second the "away" game.)	CHO	ATH	POL	STA	RIG	RBA	TRA	YEE
Choden		11–0	1–1	1–2	5–0		3–3	1–2
Druk Athletic	2–7		1–8	1–13	3–1		1–9	1–16
Druk Pol	0–0	10–1		0–5	6–0		2–2	2–2
Druk Star	1–1	5–0	2–2		13–0		1–1	3–2
Rigzung	2–3	6–0	0–9	0–11		1–5	2–5	2–10
Royal Bhutan Army (Note: Royal Bhutan Army withdrew after playing 6 matches and their matches in the second half of the season were cancelled.)	0–2 (Note: Due to the withdrawal of RBA FC, the game between them and Choden was awarded 2-0 to Choden.)	5–0	0–2	1–7			3–3	
Transport United	4–1	2–2	2–3	2–7	3–2			1–10
Yeedzin	3–2	20–0	3–0	1–2	9–2	1–2	3–1	

Updated to match(es) played on 27 Aug 2010. Source:
Legend: Blue = left column team win; Yellow = draw; Red = top row team win.
