= 2009–10 Myanmar National League =

Myanmar National League
- Season: 2009–10
- Champions: Yadanabon

Statistics of Myanmar National League in the 2009–10 season.

== Overview ==
Yadanarbon FC won the championship.

== League standings ==
Pos	Team	Pld	W	D	L	GF	GA	GD	Pts	Qualification
1	Yadanarbon FC	14	9	2	3	24	13	+11	29	2010 AFC President's Cup
2	Delta United FC	14	8	2	4	22	15	+7	26	
3	Kanbawza FC	14	7	3	4	25	18	+7	24	
4	Yangon United FC	14	7	2	5	24	16	+8	23	
5	Zayar Shwe Myay FC	14	5	2	7	19	19	0	17	
6	Okkthar United FC	14	3	6	5	11	20	−9	15	
7	Magway FC	14	3	5	6	11	18	−7	14	
8	Southern Myanmar FC	14	2	2	10	16	33	−17	8	

Source: rsssf.com

== Season statistics ==
=== Top scorers ===
As of 17 Jan, 2010.

Rank	Player	Club	Goals
1	(Myanmar) Soe Min Oo	Kanbawza FC	12
