= 2010 AFC President's Cup =

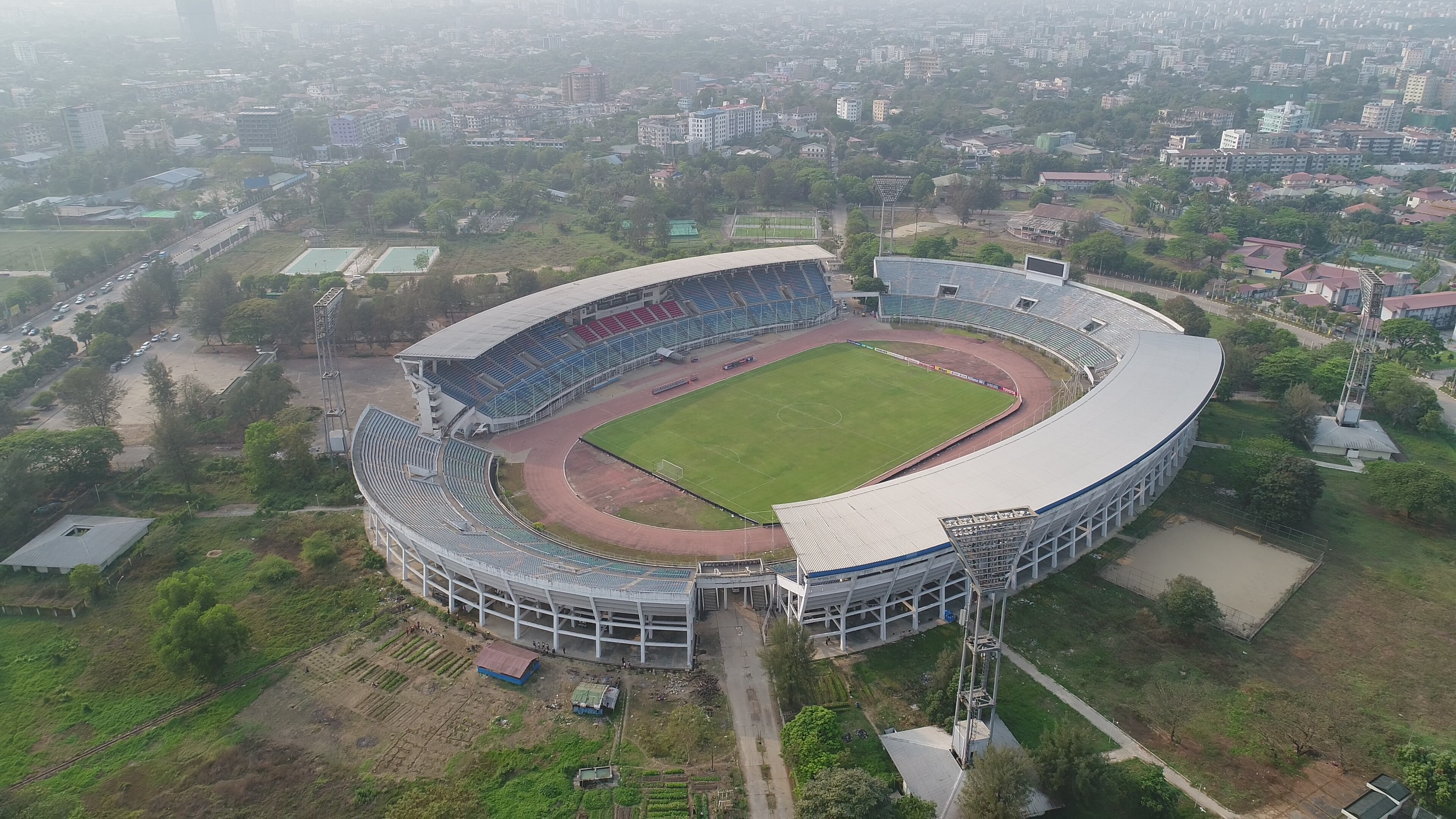
- Thuwunna Stadium in Yangon hosted the final

Tournament details
- Host country: Myanmar; Bangladesh
- Dates: 9–16 May (group stage); 24–26 September (final stage)
- Teams: 4 (final stage); 11 (total) (from 11 associations)

Final positions
- Champions: (Myanmar) Yadanabon (1st title)
- Runners-up: (Kyrgyzstan) Dordoi-Dynamo

Tournament statistics
- Matches played: 18
- Goals scored: 63 (3.5 per match)
- Attendance: 72,220 (4,012 per match)
- Top scorer(s): (Tajikistan) Rustam Usmonov (5 goals)
- Best player: (Kyrgyzstan) Mirlan Murzaev

The 2010 AFC President's Cup was the sixth edition of the AFC President's Cup, an annual international association football competition between domestic clubs sides run by the Asian Football Confederation (AFC).

== Venues ==
(Myanmar) Yangon		(Bangladesh) Dhaka
Thuwunna Stadium	Aung San Stadium	Bangabandhu National Stadium
Capacity: 32,000	Capacity: 40,000	Capacity: 36,000

== Qualifying teams ==
Association	Team	Qualifying method	App	Last App
Bangladesh	Abahani Limited	2008–09 B.League champions	3rd	2009
Bhutan	Druk Star	2009 A-Division champions	1st	none
Cambodia	Naga Corp	2009 Cambodian League champions	2nd	2008
Chinese Taipei	Hasus TSU	2009 Intercity Football League champions	1st	none
Kyrgyzstan	Dordoi-Dynamo	2009 Kyrgyzstan League champions	6th	2009
Myanmar	Yadanabon	2009 Myanmar National League champions	1st	none
Nepal	New Road Team	Martyr's Memorial A-Division League representatives (Note: As there was no league held in 2009, the top team after the first half of the 2010 season was named as the Nepalese representative by the All Nepal Football Association for the 2010 AFC President's Cup.)	1st	none
Pakistan	KRL	2009 Pakistan Premier League champions	1st	none
Sri Lanka	Renown Sports Club	2009 Sri Lanka Football Premier League champions	1st	none
Tajikistan	Vakhsh Qurghonteppa	2009 Tajik League champions	2nd	2006
Turkmenistan	HTTU Aşgabat	2009 Turkmenistan League champions	1st	none

== Group stage ==
Location of teams of the 2010 AFC President's Cup.
Group A (played in Bangladesh)
Group B (played in Myanmar)
Group C (played in Myanmar)

The draw for the AFC President's Cup 2010 was held at AFC House on 5 March 1500 hours local time.

=== Group A ===
Team	Pld	W	D	L	GF	GA	GD	Pts
(Kyrgyzstan) Dordoi-Dynamo	3	2	1	0	8	0	+8	7
(Bangladesh) Abahani Limited	3	1	2	0	2	0	+2	5
(Nepal) New Road Team	3	1	0	2	4	8	−4	3
(Chinese Taipei) Hasus TSU	3	0	1	2	3	9	−6	1

12 May 2010
16:00 UTC+6

Dordoi-Dynamo (Kyrgyzstan)	5–0	(Chinese Taipei) Hasus TSU
Tetteh 14', 45+3'; Amirov 76', 90'; Muladjanov 82'	Report

Bangabandhu National Stadium, Dhaka
Attendance: 1.000
Referee: Pratap Singh (India)

12 May 2010
19:00 UTC+6

Abahani Limited (Bangladesh)	2–0	(Nepal) New Road Team
Enamul 28', 70' (pen.)	Report

Bangabandhu National Stadium, Dhaka
Attendance: 5.500
Referee: Kim Sang-Woo (Korea Republic)

14 May 2010
16:00 UTC+6

New Road Team (Nepal)	0–3	(Kyrgyzstan) Dordoi-Dynamo
	Report	Volos 6', 75', 86'

Bangabandhu National Stadium, Dhaka
Attendance: 1,500
Referee: Apisit Aonrak (Thailand)

14 May 2010
19:00 UTC+6

Hasus TSU (Chinese Taipei)	0–0	(Bangladesh) Abahani Limited
	Report

Bangabandhu National Stadium, Dhaka
Attendance: 2,500
Referee: Dilovarshoh Orzuyev (Tajikistan)

16 May 2010
16:00 UTC+6

Hasus TSU (Chinese Taipei)	3–4	(Nepal) New Road Team
Su De-Cai 17', 58'; Chen Po-Liang 61'	Report	Shrestha 43'; Shayan 45+2'; Sinkemana 77'; Neupane 81'

Bangabandhu National Stadium, Dhaka
Attendance: 600
Referee: Apisit Aonrak (Thailand)

16 May 2010
19:00 UTC+6

Abahani Limited (Bangladesh)	0–0	(Kyrgyzstan) Dordoi-Dynamo
	Report

Bangabandhu National Stadium, Dhaka
Attendance: 2,000
Referee: Kim Sang-Woo (Korea Republic)

=== Group B ===
Team	Pld	W	D	L	GF	GA	GD	Pts
(Tajikistan) Vakhsh Qurghonteppa	3	3	0	0	10	0	+10	9
(Pakistan) KRL	3	1	0	2	3	4	−1	3
(Cambodia) Naga Corp	3	1	0	2	5	7	−2	3
(Sri Lanka) Renown Sports Club	3	1	0	2	4	11	−7	3

10 May 2010
15:30 UTC+6:30

Naga Corp (Cambodia)	1–2	(Pakistan) KRL
Chum 9'	Report	Kaleemullah 4', 30'

Aung San Stadium, Yangon
Attendance: 300
Referee: Salah Abbas Alabbasi (Bahrain)

10 May 2010
16:00 UTC+6:30

Vakhsh Qurghonteppa (Tajikistan)	6–0	(Sri Lanka) Renown Sports Club
Usmonov 57', 72', 82'; Negmatov 59'; Hakimov 60'; Hamrakulov 75'	Report

Thuwunna Stadium, Yangon
Attendance: 200
Referee: Hedayat Mombeni (Iran)

12 May 2010
15:30 UTC+6:30

KRL (Pakistan)	0–1	(Tajikistan) Vakhsh Qurghonteppa
	Report	Usmonov 63'

Aung San Stadium, Yangon
Attendance: 200
Referee: Azad Rahman (Bangladesh)

12 May 2010
16:00 UTC+6:30

Renown Sports Club (Sri Lanka)	2–4	(Cambodia) Naga Corp
Izzathul Anam 72'; Shanmugarajah 88'	Report	Vathanak 8', 13', 29'; Sambo 90'

Thuwunna Stadium, Yangon
Attendance: 50
Referee: Ali Mahmut Shaban (Kuwait)

14 May 2010
15:30 UTC+6:30

Vakhsh Qurghonteppa (Tajikistan)	3–0	(Cambodia) Naga Corp
Sodikov 44'; Usmonov 64'; Hamrakulov 75'	Report

Thuwunna Stadium, Yangon
Attendance: 100
Referee: Salah Abbas Alabbasi (Bahrain)

14 May 2010
15:30 UTC+6:30

KRL (Pakistan)	1–2	(Sri Lanka) Renown Sports Club
Ahmed 80'	Report	Fazlur Rahman 56'; Shanmugarajah 69'

Aung San Stadium, Yangon
Attendance: 100
Referee: Hedayat Mombeni (Iran)

=== Group C ===
Team	Pld	W	D	L	GF	GA	GD	Pts
(Myanmar) Yadanabon	2	1	1	0	11	0	+11	4
(Turkmenistan) HTTU Aşgabat	2	1	1	0	8	0	+8	4
(Bhutan) Druk Star	2	0	0	2	0	19	−19	0

9 May 2010
16:00 UTC+6:30

HTTU Aşgabat (Turkmenistan)	8–0	(Bhutan) Druk Star
Sarkisow 20'; Amanow 40', 83'; Şamyradow 56' (pen.), 86', 89' (pen.), 90+1'; Gazakow 88'	Report

Thuwunna Stadium, Yangon
Attendance: 500
Referee: Ko Hyung Jin (South Korea)

11 May 2010
16:00 UTC+6:30

Druk Star (Bhutan)	0–11	(Myanmar) Yadanabon
	Report	Aung Kyaw Moe 4'; Paing Soe 18', 26', 28', 34'; Yan Paing 20', 33', 43'; Ye Zaw Htet Aung 24'; Aye Moe 60'; Htet Naing Win 69'

Thuwunna Stadium, Yangon
Attendance: 5.000
Referee: Ebrahim Zakareya (Bahrain)

13 May 2010
16:00 UTC+6:30

Yadanabon (Myanmar)	0–0	(Turkmenistan) HTTU Aşgabat
	Report

Thuwunna Stadium, Yangon
Attendance: 10.000
Referee: Ng Kai Lam (Hong Kong)

=== Best runner-up ===
The best runners-up team from among the three pools qualify for the semi-finals. Because group C consists of only three teams, matches against fourth-placed sides in the other groups are excluded from the following comparison.

Grp	Team	Pld	W	D	L	GF	GA	GD	Pts
C	(Turkmenistan) HTTU Aşgabat	2	1	1	0	8	0	+8	4
A	(Bangladesh) Abahani Limited	2	1	1	0	2	0	+2	4
B	(Pakistan) KRL FC	2	1	0	1	2	2	0	3

Note on tie-breaking situation:

- HTTU Aşgabat placed ahead of Abahani Ltd. on the basis of goal difference

== Final stage ==
The final stage of the competition will be played in Myanmar from 24 to 26 September. The semi-final draw was made on 11 July.

=== Semi-finals ===
24 September 2010
15:30

Vakhsh Qurghonteppa (Tajikistan)	0–2	(Myanmar) Yadanabon
	Report	Yan Paing 44'; Aung Kyaw Moe 77'

Thuwunna Stadium, Yangon
Attendance: 18,400
Referee: Saeid Mozaffarizadeh (Iran)

24 September 2010
19:00

Dordoi-Dynamo (Kyrgyzstan)	2–0	(Turkmenistan) HTTU Aşgabat
Tetteh 71'; Murzaev 72'	Report

Thuwunna Stadium, Yangon
Attendance: 550
Referee: Ali Abdulnabi (Bahrain)

=== Final ===
26 September 2010
15:30

Yadanabon (Myanmar)	1–0 (a.e.t.)	(Kyrgyzstan) Dordoi-Dynamo
Kone 98'	Report

Thuwunna Stadium, Yangon
Attendance: 23,720
Referee: Subkhiddin Mohd Salleh (Malaysia)

AFC President's Cup 2010

1st title

== See also ==
- 2010 AFC Cup
- 2010 AFC Champions League
