= 2010 Bhutan A-Division =

A-Division (Bhutan)
- Season: 2010
- Champions: Yeedzin
- AFC President's Cup: Yeedzin
- Matches played: 42
- Goals scored: 211 (5.02 per match)
- Biggest home win: Druk Pol 9-1 Nangpa, Yeedzin 9-1 Nangpa
- Biggest away win: Druk Athletic 1-12 Druk Star
- Highest scoring: Druk Athletic 1-12 Druk Star
- Longest unbeaten run: Yeedzin (12 matches)

The 2010 season of the Bhutanese A-Division was the sixteenth recorded season of top-flight football in Bhutan. The league was won by Yeedzin, their second title.

== League table ==
Teams played each other on a home and away basis, there does not appear to have been any relegation in 2010 as Nangpa FC still featured in the A-Division in the next season.

Pos	Team	Pld	W	D	L	GF	GA	GD	Pts	Qualification
1	Yeedzin (C)	12	11	1	0	48	11	+37	34	Qualified for 2011 AFC President's Cup
2	Druk Pol	12	8	1	3	46	15	+31	25	
3	Transport United	12	8	1	3	33	19	+14	25	
4	Druk Stars	12	7	1	4	38	20	+18	22	
5	Choden	12	3	0	9	17	39	−22	9	
6	Druk Athletic	12	2	1	9	15	56	−41	7	
7	Nangpa	12	0	1	11	14	51	−37	1	

Updated to match(es) played on 13 September 2012. Source:
Rules for classification: 1) points; 2) goal difference; 3) number of goals scored.
(C) Champions

Note 1: Choden FC are Bhutan national U-19 team.
Note 2: Nangpa FC also known as Ngangpa FC.

== Results ==
Home \ Away	CHO	ATH	POL	STA	NAN	TRA	YEE
Choden		1–2	2–3	1–5	4–2	1–2	0–6
Druk Athletic	3–4		0–5	1–12	1–1	1–4	1–4
Druk Pol	8–0	7–1		2–0	9–1	2–4	2–3
Druk Stars	2–0	8–1	2–1		2–0	3–5	0–5
Nangpa	1–2	2–3	1–3	1–3		2–4	2–9
Transport United	3–1	6–0	3–2	0–0	2–0		2–4
Yeedzin	2–1	2–1	0–0	3–1	9–1	1–0	

Updated to match(es) played on 13 September 2012. Source:
Legend: Blue = home team win; Yellow = draw; Red = away team win.

Note 1: The notion of home and away fixtures in the A-Division is moot as all games are played at Changlimithang Stadium. As such, for the purpose of this table, the first result chronologically has been deemed that team's "home" game and the second the "away" game.
