= Ye Zaw Htet Aung =

Burmese footballer

Personal information
- Full name: Ye Zaw Htet Aung
- Date of birth: 1 April 1991 (age 35)
- Place of birth: Pyinmana, Myanmar
- Position: Defender

Team information
- Current team: Yadanarbon
- Number: 14

Senior career*
Years	Team	Apps	(Gls)
2009–	Yadanarbon		
2012–	Myanmar	2	(0)
2012–	Myanmar U-22	5	(0)
- * Club domestic league appearances and goals ‡ National team caps and goals as of 6 March 2013

Ye Zaw Htet Aung (Burmese: ရဲဇော်ထက်အောင်; born 1 April 1991) is a footballer from Burma, and a defender for Myanmar national football team and Myanmar U-22 football team. He is two-time Myanmar National League winner with Yadanarbon.
