= San Narith =

Cambodian footballer

Personal information
- Full name: San Narith
- Date of birth: November 7, 1986 (age 39)
- Place of birth: Cambodia
- Height: 1.72 m (5 ft 8 in)
- Position: Defender

Team information
- Current team: Western Phnom Penh

Senior career*
Years	Team	Apps	(Gls)
2007–2009	Khemara Keila FC		
2009–2010	Preah Khan Reach		
2010–2011	Phnom Penh Crown		
2011–2014	Nagacorp		
2014–2015	Albirex Niigata Phnom Penh		
2015–2016	Asia Euro United		
2016	Western Phnom Penh		

International career
2008–2016	Cambodia	14	(0)
- * Club domestic league appearances and goals

San Narith (born 7 November 1986) is a footballer from Cambodia. He made his first appearance for the Cambodia national football team in 2008.

== Honours ==
=== Club ===
Phnom Penh Crown

- Cambodian League: 2011
- 2011 AFC President's Cup: Runner up

Nagacorp FC

- Hun Sen Cup: 2013
