= 2009 Myanmar National League =

Burmese football league season

MNL Cup Grand Royal 2009 is the inaugural knock-out club football tournament of the Myanmar National League. The tournament, held at the Aung San Stadium and the Thuwunna Stadium in Yangon between 16 May and 5 July 2009, was contested by all eight clubs of the newly formed professional league. Yadanabon FC finished on top, one point ahead of Yangon United FC in group stage. On 5 July 2009, Yadanabon defeated Yangon United in the cup final on penalty shootout, to become the reigning champions of the league.

== Teams ==
- Delta United
- Kanbawza
- Magway
- Okktha United
- Southern Myanmar United
- Yadanabon
- Yangon United
- Zeyashwemye

== Results ==
=== League standings ===
Pos	Team	Pld	W	D	L	GF	GA	GD	Pts
1	Yadanabon (C, Q)	7	5	2	0	10	3	+7	17
2	Yangon United	7	5	1	1	13	6	+7	16
3	Magway	7	4	1	2	9	5	+4	13
4	Kanbawza	7	4	0	3	9	5	+4	12
5	Zeyashwemye	7	2	2	3	8	10	−2	8
6	Okktha United	7	1	2	4	4	10	−6	5
7	Southern Myanmar United	7	1	1	5	5	11	−6	4
8	Delta United	7	1	1	5	4	12	−8	4

Updated to match(es) played on 5 July 2009. Source:
(C) Champions; (Q) Qualified for the phase indicated

=== Round system ===
2009-05-16
16:00

Yangon United	4–0	Zeyashwemye

Thuwunna Stadium, Yangon
2009-05-17
16:00

Yadanabon	2–0	Southern Myanmar United

Thuwunna Stadium, Yangon
2009-05-19
16:00

Magway	1–1	Delta United

Aung San Stadium, Yangon
2009-05-21
16:00

Kanbawza	3–0	Okktha United

Aung San Stadium, Yangon
2009-05-23
16:00

Yadanabon	0–0	Zeyashwemye

Thuwunna Stadium, Yangon
2009-05-24
16:00

Yangon United	0–2	Magway

Thuwunna Stadium, Yangon
2009-05-26
16:00

Kanbawza	1–0	Southern Myanmar United

Aung San Stadium, Yangon
2009-05-28
16:00

Delta United	1–2	Okktha United

Aung San Stadium, Yangon
2009-05-30
16:00

Magway	2–1	Zeyashwemye

Thuwunna Stadium, Yangon
2009-05-31
16:00

Southern Myanmar United	2–0	Delta United

Thuwunna Stadium, Yangon
2009-06-02
16:00

Yangon United	2–1	Okktha United

Aung San Stadium, Yangon
2009-06-04
16:00

Kanbawza	0–1	Yadanabon

Aung San Stadium, Yangon
2009-06-06
16:00

Magway	1–0	Okktha United

Thuwunna Stadium, Yangon
2009-06-11
16:00

Yangon United	1–0	Southern Myanmar United

Thuwunna Stadium, Yangon
2009-06-14
16:00

Magway	2–0	Southern Myanmar United

Thuwunna Stadium, Yangon
2009-06-16
16:00

Zeyashwemye	0–0	Okktha United

Thuwunna Stadium, Yangon
2009-06-18
16:00

Yadanabon	2–2	Yangon United

Thuwunna Stadium, Yangon
2009-06-20
16:00

Okktha United	1–1	Southern Myanmar United

Thuwunna Stadium, Yangon
2009-06-21
16:00

Kanbawza	1–2	Yangon United

Thuwunna Stadium, Yangon
2009-06-23
16:00

Delta United	0–3	Zeyashwemye

Thuwunna Stadium, Yangon
2009-06-25
16:00

Magway	1–2	Yadanabon

Thuwunna Stadium, Yangon
2009-06-26
16:00

Kanbawza	2–0	Zeyashwemye

Thuwunna Stadium, Yangon
2009-06-27
16:00

Delta United	0–2	Yangon United

Thuwunna Stadium, Yangon
2009-06-28
16:00

Okktha United	0–2	Yadanabon

Thuwunna Stadium, Yangon
2009-06-29
16:00

Kanbawza	1–2	Delta United

Thuwunna Stadium, Yangon
2009-06-30
16:00

Southern Myanmar United	2–4	Zeyashwemye

Thuwunna Stadium, Yangon
2009-07-01
16:00

Magway	0–1	Kanbawza

Thuwunna Stadium, Yangon

=== Final ===
The 2009 Myanmar National League Cup final was played at 4:00 on 5 July 2009 at the Thuwunna Stadium in Yangon, Myanmar. Yadanabon defeated Yangon United on penalty kicks (4-1), after a 2–2 score at the end of regulation and extra time.

2009-07-05
04:00 Local time

Yangon United	2–2 (a.e.t.)	Yadanarbon
Myo Min Tun 41'; Kyi Lin 56'	(Report)	Yan Paing 16'; Tun Tun Win 82'
Penalties
Kyaw Don (penalty scored); Kyaw Zayar Win (penalty missed); Missipo (penalty missed)	1–4	(penalty scored) Yan Paing; (penalty scored) Kambou; (penalty scored) Tun Tun Win; (penalty scored) Khin Maung Tun

Thuwunna Stadium, Yangon
Attendance: 40,000 "pressrelease" (PDF). UEFA. 5 July 2009.

Myanmar National League Cup
2009 winners

First title

== Top goalscorers ==
As of 5 July 2009

6 goals

- Yan Paing (Yadanabon)

4 goals

- Sithu Win (Magway)
- Kyi Lin (Yangon United)

3 goals

- Tun Tun Win (Yadanabon)
- Ye Wai Yan Soe (Zeyashwemye)

2 goals

- Aung Myint Aye (Magway)
- Khin Maung Lwin (Kanbawza)
- Aung Kyaw Oo (Kanbawza)
- Wai Linn (Southern Myanmar United)
- Kera (Yangon United)
- Missipo (Yangon United)
- Aung Kyaw Moe (Yadanabon)
- Htoo Kyaw (Zeyashwemye)
- Sithu Than (Zeyashwemye)
- B James Htwe (Southern Myanmar United)
