= 2010–11 Sri Lanka Football Premier League =

Sri Lanka Football Premier League
- Season: 2010–11

2010–11 Kit Premier League is the 2010–11 season of Kit Premier League.

== Clubs ==
- Air Force SC
- Army SC
- Blue Star SC (Kalutara)
- Don Bosco SC (Negombo) (Champions)
- Java Lane SC (Colombo)
- Jupiters SC (Negombo) (Relegated)
- Kalutara Park SC (Relegated)
- New Young SC (Wennapuwa)
- Police SC
- Ratnam SC (Kotahena)
- Renown SC
- Saunders SC (Petta)

== Table ==
| Pos | Team | Pld | W | D | L | GF | GA | GD | Pts | Qualification or relegation |
|---|---|---|---|---|---|---|---|---|---|---|
| 1 | Don Bosco SC (C) | 22 | 13 | 5 | 4 | 37 | 17 | +20 | 44 | Qualification to 2011 AFC President's Cup |
| 2 | Army SC | 22 | 11 | 9 | 2 | 44 | 16 | +28 | 42 | |
| 3 | Ratnam SC | 22 | 12 | 5 | 5 | 46 | 33 | +13 | 41 | |
| 4 | Police SC | 22 | 11 | 8 | 3 | 42 | 22 | +20 | 41 | |
| 5 | New Young SC | 22 | 11 | 4 | 7 | 43 | 38 | +5 | 37 | |
| 6 | Air Force SC | 22 | 9 | 6 | 7 | 26 | 21 | +5 | 33 | |
| 7 | Blue Star SC | 22 | 8 | 7 | 7 | 25 | 21 | +4 | 31 | |
| 8 | Saunders SC | 22 | 6 | 7 | 9 | 19 | 25 | −6 | 23 (Note: 2 points deducted?) | |
| 9 | Java Lane SC | 22 | 4 | 8 | 10 | 26 | 36 | −10 | 20 | |
| 10 | Renown SC | 22 | 4 | 7 | 11 | 36 | 44 | −8 | 19 | |
| 11 | Kalutara Park SC | 22 | 3 | 7 | 12 | 21 | 45 | −24 | 16 | Relegated to Second Division |
| 12 | Jupiters SC | 22 | 2 | 3 | 17 | 17 | 64 | −47 | 9 | Relegated to Second Division |

Source: rsssf.com
(C) Champions

== Bibliography ==
- RSSSF.com
- "Super League - Sri Lanka". Soccerway. Archived from the original on November 29, 2022.
