= Marijan Šuto =

Croatian footballer

Personal information
- Full name: Marijan Šuto
- Date of birth: 2 October 1996 (age 30)
- Place of birth: Split, Croatia
- Height: 1.88 m (6 ft 2 in)
- Positions: Striker; attacking midfielder

Team information
- Current team: Croatia Zmijavci
- Number: 9

Youth career
- 2000–2007: Orkan
- 2007: RNK Split
- Imotski

Senior career*
| Years | Team | Apps | (Gls) |
| 2014–2015 | Croatia Zmijavci | 43 | (9) |
| 2016 | Warriors | 2 | (1) |
| 2017 | Home United | 9 | (0) |
| 2018 | TSV Essingen | | |
| 2018-2019 | Jadran Luka Ploče | 25 | (8) |
| 2019 | Croatia Zmijavci | 15 | (1) |
| 2020 | Trnje | 2 | (1) |
| 2020–2021 | Omonia Psevda | 25 | (6) |
| 2021–2024 | Othellos Athienou | 83 | (26) |
| 2024–25 | Krasava Ypsonas | 28 | (11) |
| 2025 | Karmiotissa FC | 14 | (7) |
| 2026- | Croatia Zmijavci | 14 | (1) |
- * Club domestic league appearances and goals as of 17 June 2026

Marijan Šuto (born 2 October 1996) is a Croatian footballer who plays as a forward for Croatia Zmijavci.

== Career ==
=== NK Orkan Dugi Rat ===
He started with NK Orkan Dugi Rat youth team when he is in Croatia before moving to RNK Split.

=== RNK Split ===
In RNK Split, he played for the U17 & U19 team.

=== Imotski FC ===
After leaving Split, he moved to Imotski FC playing for their U19 team in 2013.

=== Croatia Zmijavci ===
After leaving the U19 team in Imotski, he moved to play for Croatia Zmijavci who is in the 4th tier of Croatia football.

=== Warriors FC ===
In 2016, he signed for the Warriors FC prime league team, which is the reserve team in the S.League, from Singapore. He was the top scorer in the 2016 prime league. He scored 30 goals in 2016, 11 more goals ahead of his nearest rivals.

=== Home United ===
He then moved to the Home United Prime League squad before the start of 2017 season. He made his debut in the AFC Cup competition against Myanmar Club.
