= Abd al-Qayyum =

ʻAbd al-Qayyūm (ALA-LC romanization of Arabic: عبد القيوم) is a male Muslim given name. It is built from the Arabic words ʻabd and al-Qayyūm, one of the names of God in the Qur'an, which give rise to the Muslim theophoric names. It means "servant of the eternal". Notable people with the name include:

== Abdul Qayyum ==
- Sahibzada Abdul Qayyum (1863–1937), Indian educationalist
- Abdul Qayyum Khan (1901–1981), Pakistani politician
- Abdul Qayyum "Zakir", alleged real name of Abdullah Gulam Rasoul (born 1973), Afghan held in Guantanamo
- Abdul Qayyum (general), Pakistani Lieutenant General
- Abdul Qayyum Jamal, Pakistani-Canadian accused of terrorism
- Abdul Qayyum Sajjadi (born 1970), Afghan politician
- Mohammad Abdul Qayyum Khan (1924–2015), Azad Kashmir activist and politician

== Abdul Qayum ==
- Abdul Qayum Karzai (1947–2024), Afghan politician, brother of Hamid Karzai
- Abdul Qayum (imam) (born 1960), Bangladeshi-born British imam of the East London Mosque

== Abdul Qayoom ==
- Abdul Qayoom (cricketer) (born 1967), Indian cricketer and coach

== Others ==
- Abdol Ghayoom Ebrahimi (born 1932), founder of Gorgan University, Iran
- Maumoon Abdul Gayoom (born 1937), President of the Maldives
- Abdul Kaium (born 1948), Bangladeshi police officer, Inspector General of Bangladesh Police (2005–2006)
- Abdil Qaiyyim Mutalib (born 1989), Singapore footballer
