= Loi Hein Company =

Loi Hein Company Ltd.
- Native name: လွယ်ဟိန်းကုမ္ပဏီ
- Industry: Fast-moving consumer goods
- Founded: 1996
- Headquarters: Yangon, Myanmar
- Owner: Min Ye Kyaw Swar Bo Nay Toe
- Subsidiaries: Loi Hein Distribution Company; Yadanabon FC
- Website: www.loiheingroup.com

Loi Hein Company Limited (Burmese: လွယ်ဟိန်းကုမ္ပဏီ) is a major Myanmar-based company specializing in fast-moving consumer goods (FMCG). Loi Hein is known for its soft drink products, including the Alpine bottled water brand, and an energy drink line called Shark.

Loi Hein was founded in 1996 by Min Ye Kyaw Swar Bo Nay Toe, an ethnic Shan.
