= Sun Sopanha =

Cambodian footballer

Personal information
- Date of birth: March 2, 1985 (age 41)
- Place of birth: Phnom Penh, Cambodia
- Position: Midfielder

Senior career*
Years	Team	Apps	(Gls)
2004–2007	Kampot FC		
2008–2011	Phnom Penh Crown		
2011–2016	Nagacorp		
2017	Asia Euro United		

International career
2007–2015	Cambodia	15	(0)

Managerial career
- 2023–: Nagaworld (Assistant)
- * Club domestic league appearances and goals

Sun Sopanha (born 2 March 1985) is a Cambodian football coach and former player who is the assistant coach of Cambodian Premier League club Nagaworld.

== Honours ==
Phnom Penh Crown

- Cambodian League: 2008,2010,2011
- Hun Sen Cup: 2008, 2009
- 2011 AFC President's Cup: Runner up

Nagacorp FC

- Hun Sen Cup: 2013
