= Nangpa FC =

Bhutanese football club

Nangpa
- Full name: Nangpa Football Club
- Founded: 1974; 52 years ago
- Ground: Changlimithang; Thimphu, Bhutan
- Capacity: 15,000
- League: Bhutan A-Division
- 2012: 6th

Nangpa Football Club (also known as Ngangpa) is a football club from Thimphu, Bhutan. Founded in 1974, who played in the A Division between 2010 and 2012. They are one of the least successful teams to have played top-flight football in Bhutan, finishing last in each of the three seasons in which they competed.

== History ==
Nangpa Football Club was founded in 1974, making it the oldest football club in Bhutan. Nangpa's first recorded season in the top flight of Bhutanese football was in the 2010 season, having been promoted from the B-Division at the end of the previous season. They struggled in their first season in the A-Division, picking up only a solitary point in a draw against Druk Athletic. They also suffered several heavy defeats, losing 9–1 and 9–2 to Yeedzin and 9–1 to Druk Pol, scoring only fourteen goals in their twelve games, the lowest of all competing teams.

The following season was equally unsuccessful for the club. Although there appears to have been no relegation from the A-Division at the end of the previous year, and although few details are available, it is known that Nangpa again finished bottom.

2012 was Nangpa's final season to date in the A-Division. Again they finished bottom of the league, although they were able to pick up their first ever top-flight victory in a 2–1 win against Dzongree. Overall however, this was probably Nangpa's least successful season. They suffered very heavy defeats to Druk Pol, 19–0 and two against Yeedzin 16–0 and 12–0. Scoring only five goals in their ten games, they were this time relegated along with Transport United to the B-Division with a −70 goal difference.

Details are scant for their first season back in the B-Division, although it is known that they played. However, they can have finished no higher than third at the end of the season, as they did not participate in the promotion / relegation play-off matches.
