= Marat Adzhiniyazov =

Kyrgyz footballer (born 1991)

Personal information
- Full name: Marat Kurbanaliyevich Adzhiniyazov
- Date of birth: 1 March 1991 (age 35)
- Place of birth: Kara-Suu, Soviet Union
- Position: Defender

Team information
- Current team: Abdish-Ata

Senior career*
Years	Team	Apps	(Gls)
2011	Neftchi Kochkor-Ata		
2012	Abdish-Ata Kant		
2013	Dordoi		
2014	Abdish-Ata Kant		
2015–2017	Dordoi		
2017–2018	Neftchi Kochkor-Ata		
2018-2020	FC Alga Bishkek	9	(0)
2020-	FC Alay Osh	55	(2)
Total		64	(2)

International career^{‡}
2011–	Kyrgyzstan	6	(0)
- * Club domestic league appearances and goals as of 30 January 2024 @ 13:09(AEST) ‡ National team caps and goals as of 7 September 2015

Marat Kurbanaliyevich Adzhiniyazov (Kyrgyz: Марат Ажиниязов; Russian: Марат Курбаналиевич Аджиниязов; born 1 March 1991) is a Kyrgyzstani footballer who is a defender for Abdish-Ata and the Kyrgyzstan national football team.

== Career ==
On 31 July 2017, Adzhiniyazov moved to Neftchi Kochkor-Ata after Dordoi agreed to mutual terminate his contract.

== Career statistics ==
=== International ===
Kyrgyzstan national team
Year	Apps	Goals
2011	2	0
2012	1	0
2013	2	0
2014	1	0
2015	0	0
Total	6	0

Statistics accurate as of match played 5 September 2014
