= Pai Soe =

Burmese footballer

Personal information
- Full name: Pai Soe
- Date of birth: 22 March 1987 (age 39)
- Place of birth: Mandalay, Myanmar
- Height: 1.72 m (5 ft 7 1/2 in)
- Position: Midfielder

Team information
- Current team: Phuket FC
- Number: 16

Senior career*
Years	Team	Apps	(Gls)
2008–2009	Finance and Revenue FC		
2009–2013	Yadanabon	110	(5)
2014–2015	Phuket FC	1	(0)

International career
- Myanmar U23
2008–2013	Myanmar	33	(7)
- * Club domestic league appearances and goals

Pai Soe (born on 22 March 1987) is a Burmese footballer. He currently plays for Phuket in Thai Division 1 League. He used to play for his home town club Yadanabon in Myanmar National League. He was called up to Myanmar national football team for 2010 AFF Suzuki Cup and 2014 FIFA World Cup qualifiers.

== International goals ==
No.	Date	Venue	Opponent	Score	Result	Competition
1.	2 March 2013	Thuwunna Stadium, Yangon, Myanmar	Guam	4–0	5–0	2014 AFC Challenge Cup qualification
