= Sai Sam Htun =

Burmese businessman

Sai Sam Tun
- စိုင်းဆမ်ထွန်း
- Born: 10 April 1946 (age 80)
- Education: Washington University in St. Louis
- Occupation: Businessman
- Known for: Owner of Loi Hein Company

Sai Sam Htun (Burmese: စိုင်းဆမ်ထွန်း; also spelt Sai Sam Tun; born 10 April 1946) is a Burmese businessman and founder of Loi Hein Company, a major Burmese consumer product manufacturer, known for its bottled water, energy drink, soft drink, beer and cigarette lines.

He earned a medical degree in 1971 and an MBA from Washington University in St. Louis in the United States in 2008. He lived in Canada for 5 years, and in the United States from 1987 to 1991 before returning in 1992. He also owns Yadanabon FC.
