= 2011 Bhutan A-Division =

A-Division (Bhutan)
- Season: 2011
- Champions: Yeedzin
- AFC President's Cup: Yeedzin

The 2011 season of the Bhutanese A-Division was the seventeenth recorded season of top-flight football in Bhutan. The league was won by Yeedzin, their third title and second in a row. The league was played as a single round-robin series of matches in anticipation of the commencement of a full National League; however, this was delayed by a season.

== League table ==
Pos	Team	Pld	W	D	L	GF	GA	GD	Pts	Qualification
1	Yeedzin (C)	0	0	0	0	0	0	0	0	Qualified for 2012 AFC President's Cup
2	Zimdra	0	0	0	0	0	0	0	0	
3	Druk Pol	0	0	0	0	0	0	0	0	
4	Transport United	0	0	0	0	0	0	0	0	
5	Choden	0	0	0	0	0	0	0	0	
6	Druk Athletic	0	0	0	0	0	0	0	0	
7	Nangpa	0	0	0	0	0	0	0	0	

Updated to match(es) played on 13 September 2012. Source:
Rules for classification: 1) points; 2) goal difference; 3) number of goals scored.
(C) Champions
