= Raul Dzhalilov =

Kyrgyzstani-Kazakhstani footballer

Personal information
- Full name: Raul Zakirovich Dzhalilov
- Date of birth: 20 July 1994 (age 32)
- Place of birth: Bishkek, Kyrgyzstan
- Height: 1.69 m (5 ft 7 in)
- Position: Attacking midfielder

Team information
- Current team: FC Dordoi Bishkek
- Number: 20

Youth career
- Rubin

Senior career*
Years	Team	Apps	(Gls)
–2012	Alga	?	(4)
2013	Sunkar	21	(0)
2014–2018	Tobol	68	(7)
2015	→ Bolat (loan)	17	(2)
2018–2020	Zhetysu	31	(3)
2020–2021	Akademia Ontustik	12	(2)
2021–2022	Zhetysu	12	(1)
2022–2023	Alga Bishkek	35	(8)
2023-	FC Dordoi Bishkek	7	(1)

International career
2023–	Kyrgyzstan		
- * Club domestic league appearances and goals as of 31 January 2024 @ 04:30(AEST)

Raul Zakirovich Dzhalilov (Kyrgyz: Рауль Жалилов; Russian: Рауль Закирович Джалилов; born 20 July 1994) is a Kyrgyzstani professional footballer who plays as an attacking midfielder for Kyrgyz Premier League club Alga Bishkek.

== Career ==
As a youth player, Dzhalilov joined the youth academy of Russian top flight side Rubin.

Before the 2013 season, he signed for Sunkar in the Kazakhstani second division after playing for Kyrgyzstani club Alga.

Before the 2014 season, Dzhalilov signed for Tobol in the Kazakhstani top flight, where he made 72 appearances and scored 8 goals.

Before the 2020 season, he signed for Kazakhstani second division team Academy Ontustik.

Before the 2021 season, Dzhalilov signed for Zhetysu in the Kazakhstani top flight.
