= Pyae Lyan Aung =

Burmese footballer

Personal information
- Full name: Pyae Lyan Aung
- Date of birth: 17 December 1994 (age 31)
- Place of birth: Mandalay, Myanmar
- Height: 1.83 m (6 ft 0 in)
- Position: Goalkeeper

Team information
- Current team: YSCC Yokohama
- Number: 25

Senior career*
Years	Team	Apps	(Gls)
2013–2021	Yadanarbon	36	(0)
2021–	YSCC Yokohama	1	(0)

International career
2021	Myanmar	0	(0)
- * Club domestic league appearances and goals

Pyae Lyan Aung (Burmese: ပြည့်လျှံအောင်) is a Burmese professional footballer who plays as a goalkeeper for J3 League side YSCC Yokohama, having played for the Myanmar national football team and Yadanarbon F.C. previously. In 2021, he fled to Japan, where on 12 August, the Japanese government decided to grant him refugee status, citing a strong fear that he would be persecuted if he returned to Myanmar.
