= Yan Paing =

Burmese footballer

Personal information
- Date of birth: 27 January 1982 (age 44)
- Place of birth: Yangon, Burma
- Height: 1.82 m (6 ft 0 in)
- Position: Striker

Senior career*
Years	Team	Apps	(Gls)
2002–2009	Finance and Revenue	198	(56)
2009	Muangthong	0	(0)
2009–2017	Yadanarbon	88	(36)
Total		286	(113)

International career^{‡}
2001–2017	Myanmar	67	(13)
- * Club domestic league appearances and goals ‡ National team caps and goals as of 1 August 2017

Yan Paing (Burmese: ရန်ပိုင်) born 27 January 1982) is a Burmese footballer who played for the Myanmar national football team. He also played with Yadanarbon in Myanmar National League.

== Career ==
=== International career ===
Yan Paing played for Myanmar at the 2008 AFC Challenge Cup.

=== Club career ===
Yan Paing was top goalscorer in the inaugural Myanmar National League Cup 2009 with 6 goals in 8 games. He was also included in SoccerMyanmar.com's Best 11 players list for that season's league.

== International goals ==
No.	Date	Venue	Opponent	Score	Result	Competition
1.	25 March 2003	Malé, Maldives	Brunei	3–0	5–0	2004 AFC Asian Cup qualification
2.	25 March 2003	Malé, Maldives	Brunei	4–0	5–0	2004 AFC Asian Cup qualification
3.	23 August 2007	Petaling Jaya, Malaysia	Laos	1–0	1–0	2007 Merdeka Tournament
4.	2 August 2008	Hyderabad, India	Sri Lanka	2–1	3–1	2008 AFC Challenge Cup
5.	22 August 2008	Jakarta, Indonesia	Cambodia	5–1	7–1	2008 Indonesia Independence Cup
6.	22 August 2008	Jakarta, Indonesia	Cambodia	7–1	7–1	2008 Indonesia Independence Cup
7.	1 October 2008	Hồ Chí Minh City, Vietnam	Vietnam	2–1	3–2	Friendly
8.	15 November 2008	Yangon, Myanmar	Indonesia	1–1	2–1	2008 Myanmar Grand Royal Challenge Cup
9.	16 February 2010	Colombo, Sri Lanka	Sri Lanka	2–0	4–0	2010 AFC Challenge Cup
