= Yadanarbon F.C. =

Association football club

Yadanarbon ရတနာပုံ ဘောလုံး အသင်း
- Full name: Yadanarbon Football Club
- Nicknames: The Boxing Cakes (ထိုးမုန့်)
- Founded: 10 April 2009; 17 years ago
- Ground: Bahtoo Stadium
- Capacity: 17,000
- Head coach: Min Tun Lin
- League: Myanmar National League
- 2025–26: MNL, 7th of 12
Home colours	Away colours

Yadanarbon Football Club (Burmese: ရတနာပုံ ဘောလုံး အသင်း [jədənàbòʊɰ̃]) is a Burmese professional football club based at the Bahtoo Stadium in Mandalay. The club was a founding member of the Myanmar National League in 2009.

== History ==
=== 2009 ===
Yadanarbon FC was one of the founding clubs of the Myanmar National League and quickly became one of the most successful teams in the competition. The club won the first MNL Cup in 2009 and followed it by winning the league title in the same year. Yadanarbon later won additional league titles in 2010, 2014, and 2016.

=== 2010–2015 ===
In 2010, Yadanarbon became the first club from Myanmar to win a continental competition, the AFC President's Cup. The club has also contributed several players to the Myanmar national team and is known for its youth development. Yadanarbon has a long-standing rivalry with Yangon United.

=== 2016–2025 ===
Following the 2016 season, the club experienced a decline in performance after the departure of several key players. Yadanarbon became a mid-table team and did not challenge for the league title in the subsequent seasons.

=== 2026 ===
Ahead of the 2026–27 Myanmar National League season, the club changed ownership after 16 years under its previous management. The new owner announced plans to rebuild and reorganize the club. Sai Sam Tun retired from his role as the owner of Yadanarbon.

== Stadium ==
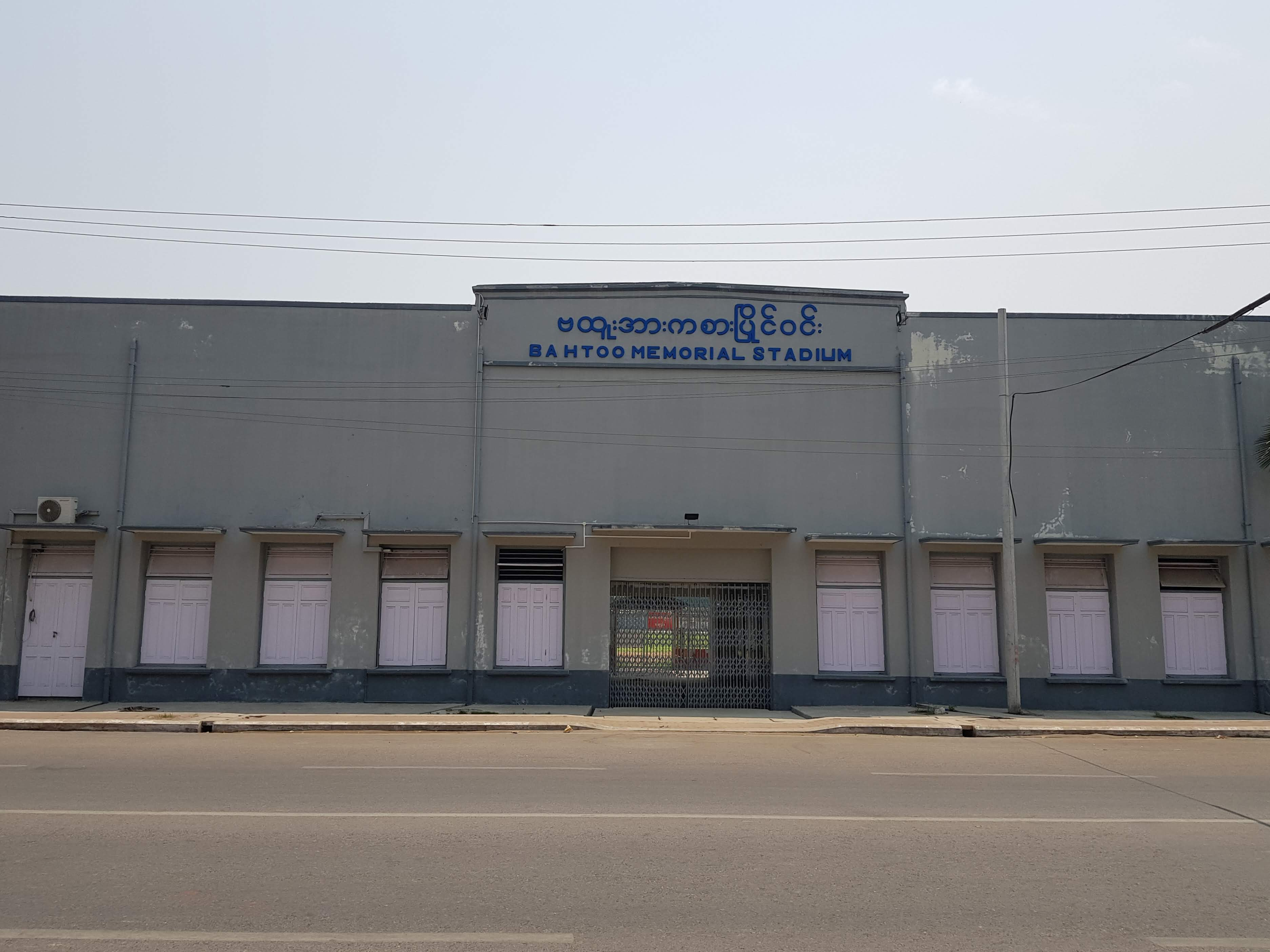
Bahtoo Stadium in 2020

Yadanarbon plays its home matches at Bahtoo Stadium, located in Mandalay, Myanmar. The stadium is a multi-purpose venue and is primarily used for football matches. It serves as the home ground of Yadanarbon and has hosted Myanmar National League matches since the club’s establishment.

== 2026-27 Squad list ==
As of 20 August 2026

Note: Flags indicate national team as defined under FIFA eligibility rules; some limited exceptions apply. Players may hold more than one non-FIFA nationality.

No.	Pos.	Nation	Player
1	GK	MYA	Pyae Phyo Aung
2	DF	MYA	Khant Thu Lin
3	DF	MYA	Soe Htet Win
4	DF	MYA	Aung Kyaw Aye
5	MF	BRA	Vitinho
6	DF	MYA	Samuel Ngai Kee
7	MF	MYA	Htet Phyo Wai
8	MF	MYA	Zar Nay Ya Thu
9	FW	GUI	Djibril Fandjé Touré
10	MF	MYA	Than Toe Aung
11	MF	MYA	Moe Swe
13	GK	MYA	Yan Lin Tun
14	MF	MYA	Thet Tun Aung
16	DF	MYA	Myo Khant Kyaw
17	DF	MYA	Thiha Htet Aung
18	MF	MYA	Wai Yan Phyo

No.	Pos.	Nation	Player
19	FW	MYA	Phyo Khant Nyein
20	FW	MYA	Suan Lam Mang
21	DF	MYA	Kalep
22	GK	MYA	Khant Min Thant
25	MF	GHA	Adobah Foster
27	MF	MYA	Thet Paing Htwe
28	MF	MYA	Hein Thet Phyo
40	DF	ITA	Felipe Ferrareze
66	MF	MYA	Yan Kyaw Soe
72	MF	MYA	Thein Zaw Thiha
73	DF	JPN	Akito Saito
77	FW	MYA	Zaw Htet Aung
90	MF	BRA	Neto
99	MF	MYA	Thurein Tun

== Individual records ==
Lists of the players with the most caps and top goalscorers for the club in the league games (players in bold signifies current Yadanarbon F.C. player).

As of 16 October 2023

Top eight goalscorers in the league
Player		Period	Goals	Ratio	Caps
1	Win Naing Soe	2014–2021	77	0.75	103
2	Keith Martu Nah	2015–2016	36	0.86	42
3	Yan Paing	2009–2017	36	0.41	88
4	Aung Thu	2013–2020	34	0.26	131
5	Edison Fonseca	2014–2015	21	1.11	19
6	Hlaing Bo Bo	2014–2023	14	0.08	167
7	Win Naing Tun	2017–2019	11	0.46	24
8	Ye Yint Aung	2019–2023	10	0.56	18

== Continental record ==
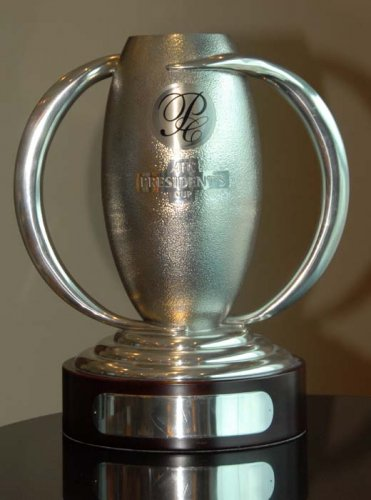
2010 AFC President's Cup Champions- Yadanarbon

Season	Competition	Round	Club	Home	Away	Aggregate
2010	AFC President's Cup	Group C	Druk Star	11–0		1st
2010	AFC President's Cup	Group C	HTTU Aşgabat	0–0		1st
2010	AFC President's Cup	Semi-final	Vakhsh Qurghonteppa	2–0		
2010	AFC President's Cup	Final	Dordoi Bishkek	1–0 (aet)		**Champions**
2011	AFC President's Cup	Group B	Yeedzin	6–0		2nd
2011	AFC President's Cup	Group B	Jabal Al-Mukaber	4–3		2nd
2011	AFC President's Cup	Group B	Istiklol	1–1		2nd
2011	AFC President's Cup	Group B	Phnom Penh Crown	0–4		
2011	AFC President's Cup	Group B	Neftchi Kochkor-Ata	2–8		
2015	AFC Champions League	Preliminary Round 1	Warriors	1–1 (p)		
2015	AFC Cup	Group G	South China	0–3	1–3	4th
2015	AFC Cup	Group G	Pahang	2–3	4–7	4th
2015	AFC Cup	Group G	Global FC	2–0	1–4	4th
2016	Mekong Club Championship	First round	SHB Đà Nẵng	2–2		
2016	Mekong Club Championship	First round	Lanexang United	3–3		
2017	AFC Champions League	Preliminary Round 2	Sukhothai	0–5		
2017	AFC Cup	Group H	Home United	1–0	1–4	3rd
2017	AFC Cup	Group H	Than Quảng Ninh	0–3	1–1	3rd

== Honours ==
=== Domestic ===
- **Myanmar National League**
  - **Champions (4): 2009–10, 2010, 2014, 2016**
  - **Runners-up (1): 2015**
- **MNL Cup**
  - **Winners (1): 2009**
- **General Aung San Shield**
  - Runners-up (1): 2015
- **MFF Charity Cup**
  - Runners-up (2): 2015, 2017

=== Youth competitions ===
- **MNL U-21 Youth League**
  - Champion (2): 2011, 2013
  - Runners-up (1): 2015
  - Third place (3): 2012, 2014, 2018
- **MNL U-19 Youth League**
  - Runners-up (2): 2018, 2019
  - ' Third place (1): 2017

=== Continental ===
- **AFC President's Cup**
  - Winners (1): 2010

== Domestic league and cup history ==
Season	Div.	Pos.	Pl.	W	D	L	GS	GA	P	Domestic Cup	Top scorer	Goals	Coach
2009–10	1st	**1**	14	9	2	3	24	13	**29**	Champions			Yoann Girard
2010	1st	**1**	20	13	5	2	44	16	**44**		Molo Hilaire	11	Yoann Girard
2011	1st	**9**	22	6	5	11	28	31	**23**				
2012	1st	**3**	26	16	8	2	57	22	**56**	Quarter-finals	Adama Koné	16	José Alves Borges
2013	1st	**5**	22	8	8	6	28	20	**32**		Yan Paing	6	Zaw Lay Aung
2014	1st	**1**	22	15	6	1	43	16	**51**	Semi-finals	Edison Fonseca	21	Khin Maung Tint
2015	1st	**2**	22	14	4	4	53	30	**46**	Runner-up	Keith Martu Nah	10	René Desaeyere
2016	1st	**1**	22	17	3	2	52	18	34	Semi-finals	Win Naing Soe	16	René Desaeyere
2017	1st	**3**	22	14	5	3	50	27	47	Semi-finals	Patrick Asare	10	René Desaeyere
2018	1st	**5**	22	9	7	6	37	30	34	Second round	Win Naing Soe	11	Aung Kyaw Moe
2019	1st	**5**	22	9	5	8	41	32	32	Quarter-final	Win Naing Soe	18	Aung Kyaw Moe
2020	1st	**5**	20	5	5	8	30	30	20		Win Naing Soe	10	Aung Kyaw Moe
2022	1st	**6**	18	8	4	6	30	19	28		Ye Yint Aung	10	Aung Kyaw Moe
2023	1st	**10**	22	5	8	9	25	32	23		Thet Hein Soe; Swan Htet; Moe Swe	5	Aung Kyaw Moe
2024-25	1st	6	22	8	7	7	37	39	31	Semi-finals			Aung Kyaw Moe
2025-26	1st	7	22	7	5	10	38	38	26	Semi-finals	Pyae Moe	11	Myint Ko

== Sponsorship ==
Period	Sportswear	Sponsor
2014	FBT	(Thailand) M-150
2015	FBT	(Myanmar) Alpine
2016	FBT	(Myanmar) Alpine
2017	FBT	(Myanmar) Alpine
2018	FBT	(Myanmar) Alpine
2019	FBT	(Myanmar) Alpine
2020–2025	M21	(Myanmar) Alpine
2026–	M21	(South Korea) Samsung
