= Tamang people =

Indigenous native of Nepal, Bhutan and India

Tamang
तामाङ
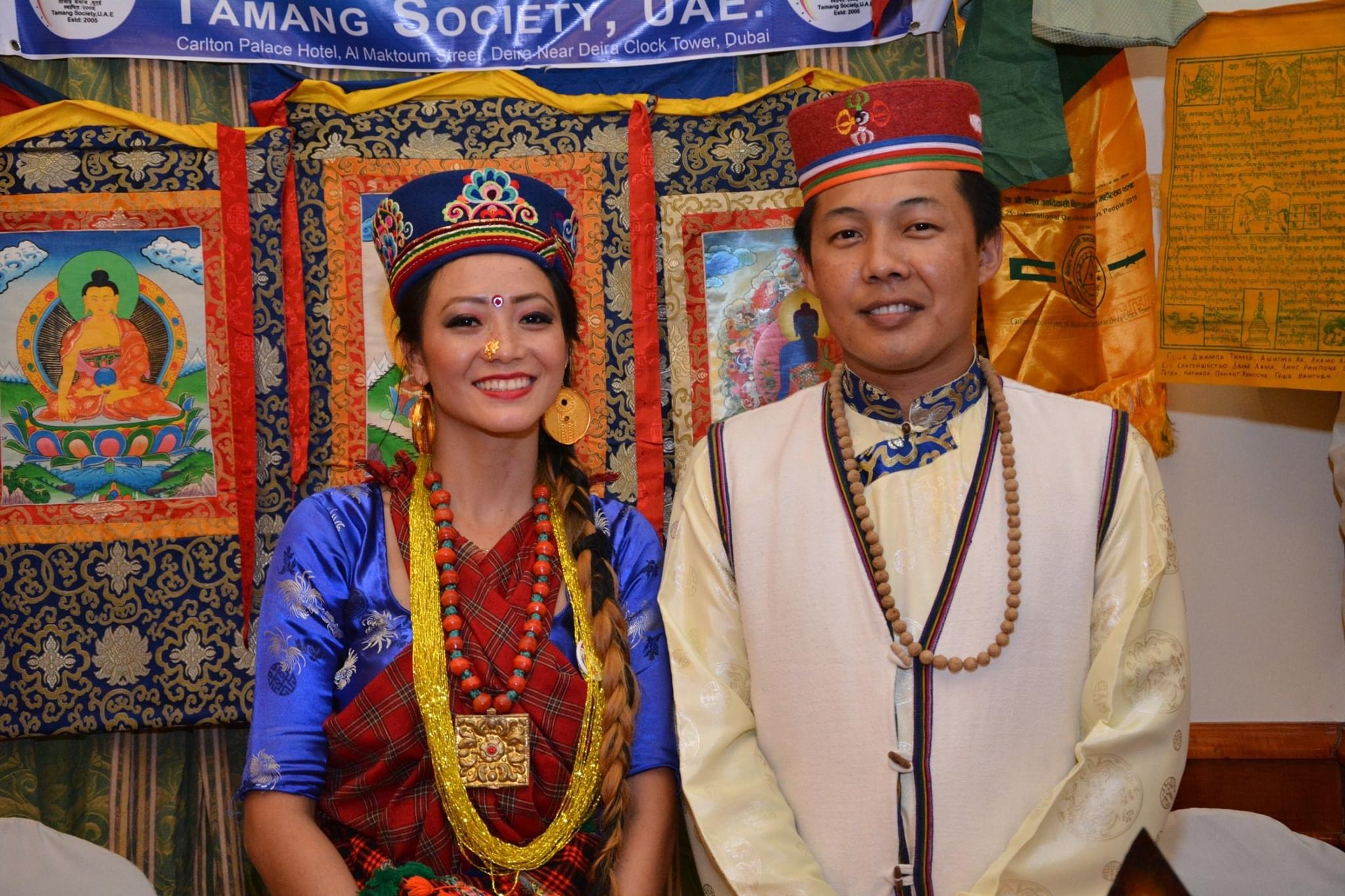
- Tamang couple in traditional attire

Total population
- c. 1.8 million

Regions with significant populations
- Bhutan: N/A
- Nepal: 1,639,866 (2021)
- India: 183,812
- West Bengal: 146,203 (2011)
- Sikkim: 37,609 (2011)

Languages
- Tamang, Tibetan, Nepali, Hindi

Religion
- Predominantly Buddhism; Minority: Hinduism, Christianity, Bon & Prakriti

Related ethnic groups
- Tibetan people, Daman people, Qiang, Gurung, Sherpa, Bhotiya, Thakali

Tamang people

Tibetan name
- Tibetan: རྟ་དམག
Transcriptions
- Tibetan Pinyin: Tamang

The Tamang people (རྟ་དམག་; Devanagari: तामाङ; tāmāṅ) are an ethnic group living in Nepal, Northeast India and southern Bhutan. In Nepal, they are concentrated in the central hilly and Himalayan regions and constituted over 1.6 million people in the 2021 census. In India, Tamang people live in the state of Sikkim, in the Darjeeling and Kalimpong districts of West Bengal and in Assam. In Bhutan, they live foremost in the southern foothills including Tsirang District, Dagana District, Samtse District, Chukha District, Sarpang District and Samdrup Jongkhar District. The Tamang language is the fifth most-spoken language in Nepal.

== History ==
Research indicates that the Tamang people are a hybrid ethnic group with an estimated 59% genetic contribution from Tibetan and 41% from Nepalese ancestries. The Tamangs have been mentioned in various Nepalese and colonial historical records under a variety of names, such as Bhote, Bodh, Lama, Murmi and Sain, some of which terms erroneously conflate the Tamangs with Uighurs. The Tibetans called them Rongpa.

Various Gorkha rulers led campaigns against the indigenous Tamangs. The Gorkha Vamsavali provides details of battles with the Bhotyas of a variety of principalities between 1806 and 1862. In 1739, a ruler named Ghale-Botya attacked Nara Bhupal Shah as he was marching towards Nuwakot, and Nara Bhupal Shah also fought several battles against Golma Ghale (Gyalpo). In 1762, Prithvi Narayan Shah attacked the Tamangs in Temal, the Tamang cultural heartland. Tamang oral history says that the local chief, Rinjen Dorje, was killed by the Gorkhas. Gorkhali forces had hidden their weapons in the sand on the Sunkoshi riverbank in order to attack the Tamang forces. Afterwards, the Gorkhas washed their weapons in springs at Dapcha Kuwapani, and this is why the modern-day Tamangs do not drink there. Similar stories appear in oral histories throughout the region.

After the attack on the Tamang region, their traditional homeland area, known as kipat to the Gorkhas, was granted to Gorkha generals or government officials who had pleased the king in some way, displacing the Tamangs from kipat lands. Previously, Tamang landholdings had been divided up by clan. Tamangs also had various forced labor obligations, both in times of peace and war, that differed significantly from other regions of Nepal. One reason is the proximity of the Tamang homeland to the center of royal administration at Kathmandu.

Tamangs were also involved in the Sino-Nepalese War from 1788 to 1792, which was initially fought between Nepalese Gorkhas and Tibetan armies over a trade dispute related to a long-standing problem of low-quality coins manufactured by Nepal for Tibet. A few hundred Tamangs eventually settled in Tibet; they are known as Daman people in China. Previously stateless, since 2003 the Chinese government has classified them as ethnic Tibetans.

== Culture ==
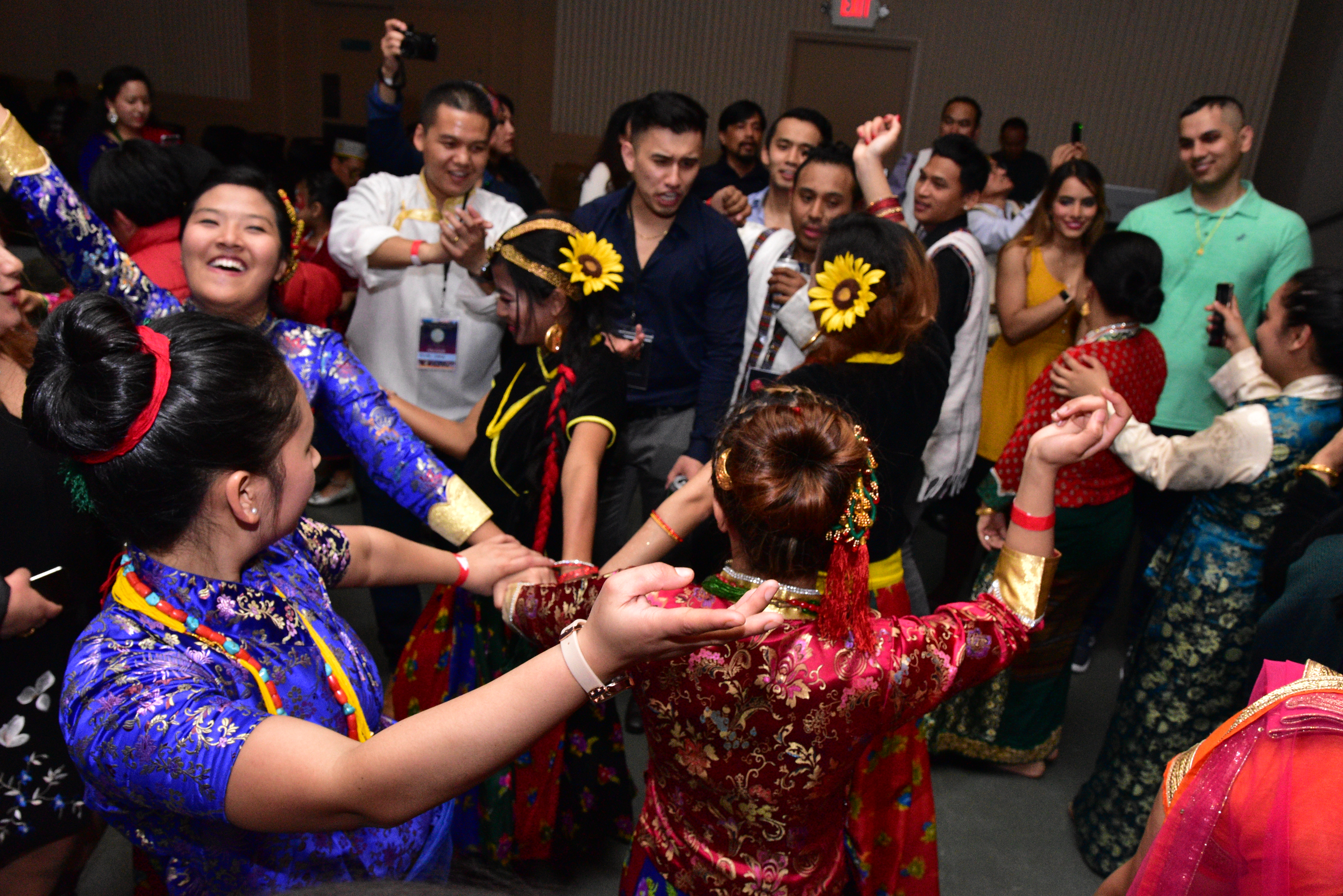
People dancing in Sonam Lhosar (Tamang New Year) celebration

Tamang tradition and culture include a distinct language, culture, dress, and social structure. They have over 100 sub-clans. About 87% of the Tamang people are Buddhist, around 3% are Christian and 8% Hindu. Their language, Tamang, comes from Tamangic branch of the Tibeto-Burman language family, and is closely related to Gurung. They follow the Chinese lunar calendar of the 12-year cycle. Colorful printed Buddhist mantra cloths are put up in various places in villages and towns.

Their typical song and dance style is known as Tamang Selo, and includes songs representing humor, satire, joy and sorrow. It has a brisk movement and rhythmic beat specific to the Tamangs. A distinctive musical instrument is the damphu, a small, round drum covered with goatskin. Traditional Tamang songs are known as Hwai. Sung by Tamang genealogists called Tamba, Hwai songs are ritualistic and hold tremendous importance in Tamang rituals.

=== Festivals ===
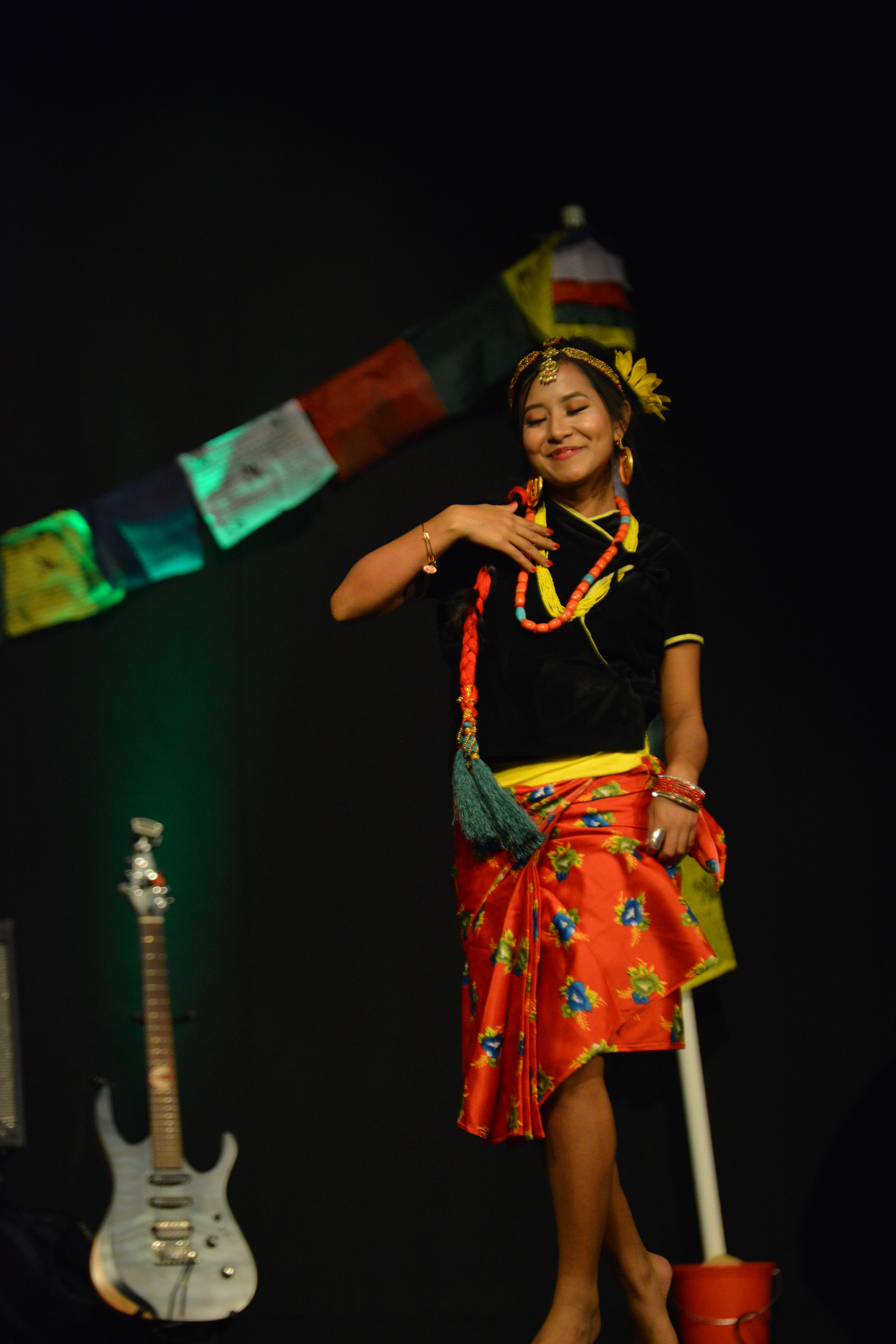
Tamang girl in Sonam Lhosar Festival

Sonam Lhosar is the main festival of the Tamangs and is celebrated in the month of Magh (February–March). It is celebrated to welcome the Tamang new year. Another significant festival is the Saga Dawa, a religious festival based on birthday of Gautam Buddha.

== Language ==
Tamang is a Sino-Tibetan language spoken predominantly in Nepal, with significant communities in Sikkim and West Bengal, India. It encompasses several dialects, including Eastern, Western, Southwestern, Northwestern, and Eastern Gorkha Tamang, with varying degrees of mutual intelligibility. For instance, Eastern and Western Tamang are mutually unintelligible. It is tonal and exhibits ergative-absolutive alignment. Despite being the fifth most spoken language in Nepal, Tamang faces challenges due to the dominance of Nepali, leading to concerns about language preservation. The language employs both the Tamyig script, similar to Tibetan, and Devanagari for writing. Grammatically, Tamang follows a subject-object-verb (SOV) order and utilizes postpositions.

== Distribution of Tamang in Nepal ==
The 2011 Nepal census classifies the Tamang people within the broader social group of Mountain–Hill Janajati. At the time of the Nepal census of 2011, 1,539,830 people (5.8% of the population of Nepal) were Tamang. The percentage of Tamang people by province was as follows:

- Bagmati Province (20.5%)
- Koshi Province (4.7%)
- Madhesh Province (2.2%)
- Gandaki Province (2.1%)
- Karnali Province (0.8%)
- Sudurpashchim Province (0.4%)
- Lumbini Province (0.2%)

In the following districts, the percentage of Tamang people was higher than the national average of 5.8% (2011):

- Rasuwa (69.6%)
- Makwanpur (48.3%)
- Nuwakot (43.0%)
- Kavrepalanchok (34.5%)
- Sindhupalchowk (34.4%)
- Sindhuli (27.0%)
- Dhading (22.2%)
- Ramechhap (19.2%)
- Dolakha (16.8%)
- Lalitpur (13.1%)
- Humla (13.0%)
- Manang (12.6%)
- Okhaldhunga (9.7%)
- Bhojpur (9.4%)
- Solukhumbu (9.3%)
- Bhaktapur (8.9%)
- Sankhuwasabha (8.8%)
- Kathmandu (8.3%)
- Chitwan (7.9%)
- Mugu (7.9%)
- Lamjung (7.3%)
- Panchthar (7.1%)
- Ilam (7.0%)
- Udayapur (6.9%)
- Tehrathum (6.6%)
- Dhankuta (6.5%)

== Notable people ==
=== Arts and entertainment ===
- Aruna Lama – singer, called the "Nightingale of the Hills"
- Buddha Lama – first Nepal Idol winner, singer, musician, composer
- Raju Lama – singer, lead vocalist of Mongolian Heart band
- Nima Rumba – singer, musician, composer, and actor
- Phiroj Shyangden – singer and composer of 1974 Band
- Prashant Tamang – third Indian Idol winner, singer, actor
- Robin Tamang – rock musician and actor
- VTEN (Samir Ghising) – rapper
- Parijat (Bishnu Kumari Waiba) – Indian-born Nepali writer
- Hira Devi Waiba – Indian singer in Nepali-language Tamang Selo
- Navneet Aditya Waiba – singer
- Gopal Yonjan – musician, music producer, and composer
- Karma Yonzon – singer, musician, music producer, and composer

=== Politics ===
- Bhim Bahadur Tamang – politician
- Madan Tamang – Indian politician and the president of Akhil Bharatiya Gorkha League (ABGL)
- Subhash Ghisingh – founding leader of Gorkha National Liberation Front (GNLF)
- Prem Singh Tamang – 6th and current Chief Minister of the Indian state of Sikkim

=== Engineering, science and social science ===
- Kul Man Ghising – engineer, managing director of Nepal Electricity Authority
- Mahendra P. Lama – Indian political analyst and development economist
- Jyoti Prakash Tamang – Indian microbiologist, known for his work on fermented foods of Himalayan region
- Vijay Lama – actor

=== Sportspeople ===
==== Indian ====
- Nim Dorjee Tamang – footballer
- Nagen Tamang – footballer from Kurseong
- Nim Dorjee Tamang – footballer
- Nagen Tamang – footballer
- Anju Tamang – footballer

==== Nepalese ====
- Kabiraj Negi Lama – team coach for Nepal at the 2020 Summer Paralympics and 2024 Summer Paralympics
- Sunil Bal – professional footballer
- Ayush Ghalan – professional footballer
- Shrijana Ghising – Para Taekwondo practitioner
- Aashish Lama – professional footballer
- Anu Lama – professional footballer
- Bidhan Lama – won bronze medals at the 1986 Asian Games, 1987 World Taekwondo Championships and at the 1988 Summer Olympics
- Bikram Lama – professional footballer
- Suman Lama – professional footballer
- Ananta Tamang – professional footballer
- Devendra Tamang – professional footballer
- Raju Tamang – professional footballer
- Ratnajit Tamang – professional badminton player
- Santosh Tamang – professional footballer
- Surya Tamang – professional cricketer
- Tej Tamang – professional footballer
