= Nagen Tamang =

Indian footballer (born 1989)

Personal information
- Date of birth: 19 February 1989 (age 37)
- Place of birth: Kurseong, West Bengal
- Height: 1.78 m (5 ft 10 in)
- Position: Striker

Youth career
- New Delhi Heroes

Senior career*
Years	Team	Apps	(Gls)
2011–12	Royal Wahingdoh		
2012–13	Rangdajied	4	(0)
2015	Royal Wahingdoh	12	(0)
2017	Transport United		
2018	Langsning FC	2	(0)
2018–2021	Real Kashmir F.C.		
- * Club domestic league appearances and goals as of 25 April 2019

Nagen Tamang (born 19 February 1989 in Kurseong) is an Indian professional footballer who plays as a forward.

== Career ==
=== Rangdajied United ===
Tamang made his professional debut for Rangdajied in the I-League on 4 October 2013 against Dempo at the Jawaharlal Nehru Stadium, Shillong; in which he played till the 76th minute before being replaced by Laldingngheta; as Rangdajied drew the match 2–2.

=== Transport United ===
In 2017, Tamang joined Bhutan National League side Transport United. On 7 August 2018 he scored a goal against Paro United. On 9 August 2017 he scored a hat-trick against Thimphu City and led his side to a 6–3 win that placed his side three goals ahead of Thimphu City and on the top of the table. He became an inevitable ingredient of the side which eventually won the silverware. The 2017 Bhutan National Leaguetitle triumph gave Tamang's CV a necessary kick which was missing earlier in his career.

" I am happy that we won the title. Among all the moments in the league, that feeling when I scored against Thimphu City was amazing. I hope I will be called back to play for the club again"

— Tamang on winning Bhutan National League

=== Real Kashmir ===
On 26 August 2018, Nagen Tamang signed for newly promoted side Real Kashmir F.C. for season 2018–19 in the I-League.

On 11 December 2018, he scored a goal against Shillong Lajong, his first goal in the I-League. Real Kashmir won the match 6–1 and Nagen was adjudged as the Hero of the match.

== Career statistics ==
As of 24 May 2015

Club	Season	League			Federation Cup		Durand Cup		AFC		Total	
Club	Season	Apps	Goals	Apps	Goals	Apps	Goals	Apps	Goals	Apps	Goals	
Rangdajied	2013-14	4	0	0	0	0	0	-	-	4	0	
Rangdajied	Royal Wahingdoh	2014-15	9	0	0	0	0	0	–	–	9	0
Career total			13	0	0	0	0	0	0	0	13	0

== Honours ==
=== Club ===
Transport United

- Bhutan National League (1): 2017

== See also ==
- List of Indian football players in foreign leagues
