= 2017 Bhutan National League =

Bhutan National League
- Season: 2017
- Champions: Transport United
- Relegated: None
- AFC Cup: Transport United
- Matches: 30
- Goals: 178 (5.93 per match)
- Top goalscorer: Chencho Gyeltshen (22 goals)
- Biggest home win: Thimphu City 13–0 Phuentsholing City; Thimphu City 13–0 Paro United
- Biggest away win: Phuentsholing City 0–13 Transport United
- Highest scoring: Paro United 13–2 Phuentsholing City

The 2017 Bhutan National League was the sixth season of national football competition in Bhutan, having replaced the A-Division (Bhutan) in 2013. Again, the Thimphu League provides the qualifiers from Thimphu, with the top three teams in that competition being awarded places in the National League alongside three regional teams.

== Thimphu League ==
=== Format and rules ===
The Thimphu League is a regional competition for teams from Thimphu. the competition consists of nine teams, each plays the others twice – home and away – for a total of 16 games each, over 18 game weeks. 3 points are awarded for a win, 1 point for a draw and 0 points for a loss. The league table is decided firstly on points won, then on goal difference and finally on total goals scored if the previous two are equal. The first three teams automatically qualify for the National league, the bottom two teams compete in relegation playoffs with the top two teams from the B-Division for two places in the next seasons's competition.

=== Competing clubs ===
Location of teams participating in the 2016 Thimphu League.
- Bhutan U-19s
- Druk Pol
- Druk Stars
- Druk United
- High Quality United
- Terton
- Thimphu
- Thimphu City
- Transport United

=== Season summary ===
The 2017 season of the Thimphu League, previously called the Bhutan A-Division, started on 4 February 2017 and is due to end on 8 July. Thimphu City are defending champions and the competition has been expanded to 9 teams in 2017 with the addition of High Quality United, Bhutan U19 and the return of Transport United following the relegation of Tensung and Bhutan U17. On July 1, 2017, Druk Pol F.C. was suspended for 2 years after some of its players mishandled and disobeyed the referee during a match on June 29.

=== League table ===
| Pos | Team | Pld | W | D | L | GF | GA | GD | Pts | Qualification or relegation |
|---|---|---|---|---|---|---|---|---|---|---|
| 1 | Thimphu City | 14 | 13 | 1 | 0 | 70 | 10 | +60 | 40 | 2017 Bhutan National League |
| 2 | Transport United | 14 | 10 | 2 | 2 | 43 | 12 | +31 | 32 | 2017 Bhutan National League |
| 3 | Thimphu | 14 | 8 | 2 | 4 | 38 | 22 | +16 | 26 | 2017 Bhutan National League |
| 4 | Druk Stars | 14 | 7 | 1 | 6 | 32 | 34 | −2 | 22 | |
| 5 | High Quality United | 14 | 6 | 1 | 7 | 37 | 36 | +1 | 19 | |
| 6 | Bhutan U19 | 14 | 3 | 3 | 8 | 28 | 28 | 0 | 12 | |
| 7 | Druk United | 14 | 3 | 2 | 9 | 21 | 44 | −23 | 11 | Relegation |
| 8 | Terton | 14 | 0 | 0 | 14 | 13 | 96 | −83 | 0 | Relegation |
| 9 | Druk Pol | 0 | 0 | 0 | 0 | 0 | 0 | 0 | 0 | Relegation |

Updated to match(es) played on 8 August 2017. Source:
Rules for classification: 1) points; 2) goal difference; 3) number of goals scored.

=== Results ===
| Home \ Away | BHU | POL | STA | UTD | HQU | TER | THI | CIT | TPU |
|---|---|---|---|---|---|---|---|---|---|
| Bhutan U-19s | | | 0–1 | 3–0 | 0–0 | 11–2 | 2–2 | 0–5 | 0–1 |
| Druk Pol | | | | | | | | | |
| Druk Stars | 4–2 | | | 2–2 | 3–1 | 7–1 | 1–2 | 1–3 | 1–2 |
| Druk United | 2–2 | | 1–3 | | 2–1 | 2–1 | 0–2 | 2–7 | 1–4 |
| High Quality United | 2–1 | | 3–4 | 3–1 | | 8–2 | 1–2 | 2–6 | 3–1 |
| Tertons | 0–6 | | 2–3 | 1–6 | 1–7 | | 0–9 | 1–7 | 0–7 |
| Thimphu | 2–1 | | 3–2 | 7–0 | 2–3 | 5–1 | | 1–5 | 1–1 |
| Thimphu City | 4–0 | | 6–0 | 3–2 | 7–1 | 12–0 | 2–0 | | 0–0 |
| Transport United | 3–0 | | 6–0 | 5–0 | 4–2 | 6–1 | 3–0 | 0–3 | |

Updated to match(es) played on 27 September 2017. Source:
Legend: Blue = home team win; Yellow = draw; Red = away team win.

Note 1: The notion of home and away fixtures in the A-Division is moot as all games are played at Changlimithang Stadium. As such, for the purpose of this table, the first result chronologically has been deemed that team's "home" game and the second the "away" game.

== National League ==
=== League table ===
| Pos | Team | Pld | W | D | L | GF | GA | GD | Pts | Qualification |
|---|---|---|---|---|---|---|---|---|---|---|
| 1 | Transport United (C) | 10 | 9 | 1 | 0 | 37 | 11 | +26 | 28 | 2018 AFC Cup preliminary round |
| 2 | Thimphu City | 10 | 7 | 2 | 1 | 48 | 12 | +36 | 23 | |
| 3 | Ugyen Academy | 10 | 5 | 1 | 4 | 32 | 10 | +22 | 16 | |
| 4 | Thimphu | 10 | 4 | 1 | 5 | 25 | 18 | +7 | 13 | |
| 5 | Paro United | 10 | 2 | 1 | 7 | 29 | 36 | −7 | 7 | |
| 6 | Phuentsholing City | 10 | 0 | 0 | 10 | 7 | 91 | −84 | 0 | |

Source: FIFA Soccerway
Rules for classification: 1) points; 2) Head-to-head points; 3) Head-to-head goal difference; 4) Head-to-head goals scored; 5) goal difference; 6) number of goals scored
(C) Champions
