= Jyoti Prakash Tamang =

Indian microbioligist (1961–2025)

- Born: 16 November 1961; Darjeeling, West Bengal, India
- Died: 29 April 2025 (aged 63); Siliguri, West Bengal, India
- Education: Turnbull High School, Darjeeling; St Joseph's College, Darjeeling; University of North Bengal; National Food Research Institute; Institute of Hygiene and Toxicology
- Known for: Studies on fermented food
- Awards: 1996 United Nations University Women's Association Award; 2004 N-BIOS Prize; 2010 Gourmand World Cookbook Award
- Scientific career
- Fields: Food technology; Microbiology
- Workplaces: Sikkim University(central university)

Jyoti Prakash Tamang (16 November 1961 – 29 April 2025) was an Indian food microbiologist, and the Senior Professor in Microbiology of the Sikkim Central University. His work centred on fermented foods and alcoholic beverages of the Himalayan regions of India, Nepal, Bhutan, and South East Asia. He was a recipient of the National Bioscience Award for Career Development in 2005.

== Background ==
Jyoti Prakash Tamang was born on 16 November 1961 in the mountain district of Darjeeling in the Indian state of West Bengal. He completed his schooling at Turnbull High School, Darjeeling in 1977 and class XII at the St Joseph's College, Darjeeling in 1979. His undergraduate education was at the Darjeeling Government College of North Bengal University from where he passed B.Sc. honours in 1982 and continued at the institution to earn an M.Sc. in microbiology in 1984, passing the examination winning a gold medal for academic excellence.

He started his career in 1986 as an associate professor at the department of botany of Sikkim Government College, Tadong where he worked until 2011. Simultaneously, he enrolled at North Bengal University for his doctoral studies; after securing a PhD in microbiology in 1992, he did his post-doctoral work at two institutions abroad during 1994–1995 — first at the National Food Research Institute, Tsukuba with a fellowship from the United Nations University-Kirin Brewery Company and, later, at the Institute of Hygiene and Toxicology, Karlsruhe, on a fellowship received from Volkswagen Foundation.

In 2011, he joined Central University Sikkim (CUS) as a member of faculty; he remained there throughout his life. He held various positions at the university, including those of an academic coordinator, the dean of the School of Life Sciences, the first registrar of the university, and a professor. He also served as the officiating vice-chancellor of the university. In between, he had a short stint at the Research Institute of Humanity and Nature of the Ministry of Education, Science and Technology, Kyoto as a visiting professor during 2009–2010. He was also visiting professor in Chonbuk National University Hospital, Jeonju, South Korea and AIST, Tsukuba in Japan.

Tamang died in Siliguri on 29 April 2025, at the age of 63.

== Legacy ==
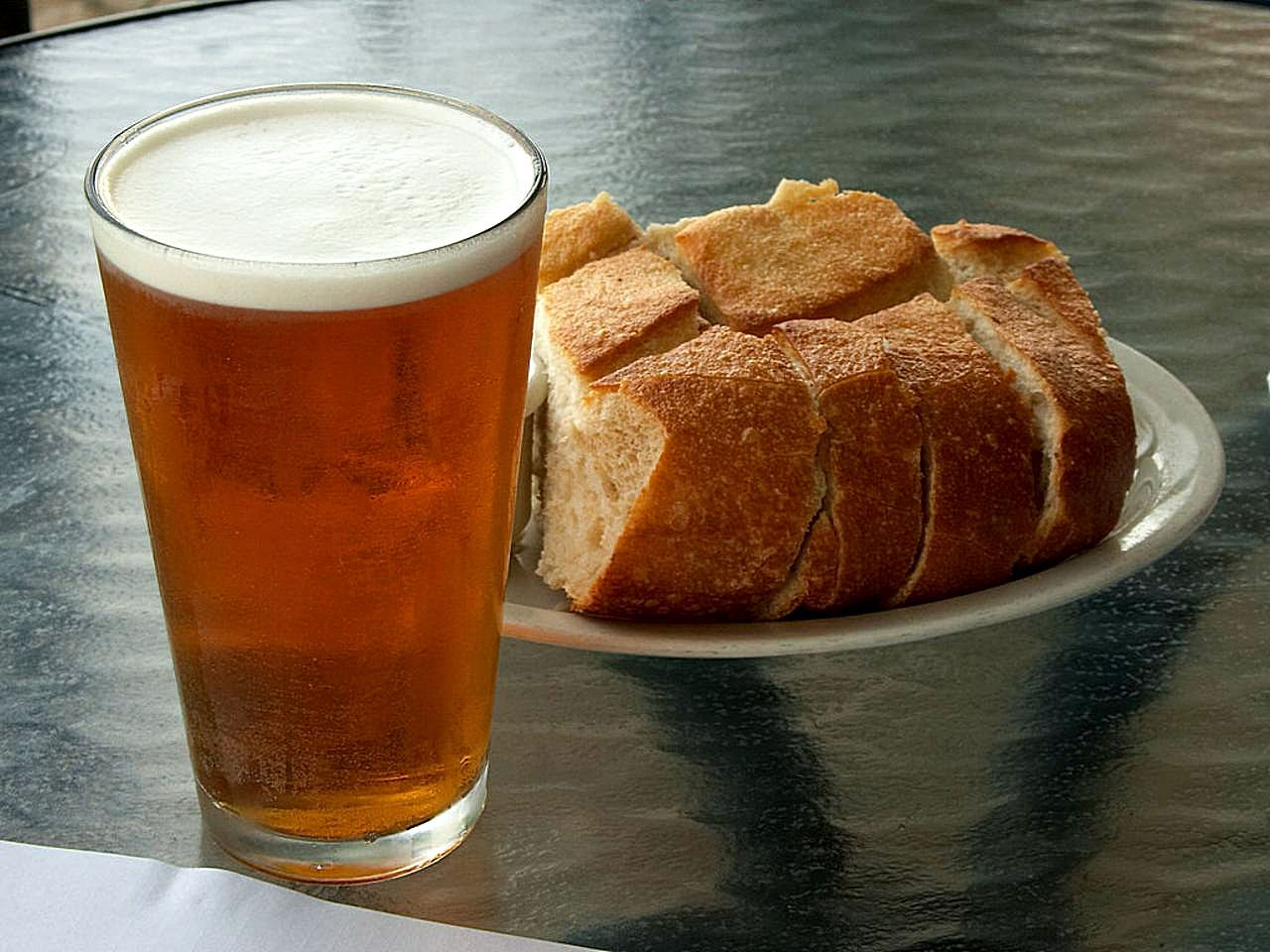
Beer and bread, two major uses of fermentation in food

Tamang's research focused on ethnic fermented foods and beverages of the Himalayan regions of India, Nepal, Bhutan, and other Asian countries, focusing on food antiquity and culture, gastronomy, metataxonomic, multi-omics approaches, starter culture development, food safety, probiotics, whole genome sequencing, nutrition, and health benefits. Tamang's findings have contributed to a paradigm shift from conventional microbial taxonomy to sequence-based taxonomy to study the micro- and mycobiomes of ethnic fermented foods and beverages of India.

He published seven books, including Himalayan Fermented Foods: Microbiology, Nutrition, and Ethnic Values, Ethnic fermented foods and alcoholic beverages of Asia, Fermented foods and beverages of the world, Health benefits of fermented foods and beverages, and Ethnic Fermented Foods and Alcoholic Beverages of India: Science History and Culture.

== Awards and honours ==
Tamang received the Women's Association Award of the United Nations University in 1996. The Department of Biotechnology of the Government of India awarded him the National Bioscience Award for Career Development, one of the highest Indian science awards in 2005. He was elected as a Fellow of Biotech Research Society of India (2006), Fellow of Indian Academy of Microbiological Sciences (2010), Fellow of National Academy of Agricultural Sciences (2013), Fellow of Indian National Science Academy (2022) and Fellow of National Academy of Sciences, India (2022). He received the Gourmand World Cookbook Award in 2010. He was International Centre for Integrated Mountain Development (ICIMOD)-Mountain Chair (2019-2022). Tamang was nominated as the Global Kimchi Ambassador by the World Institute of Kimchi of the Government of South Korea.

== Selected bibliography ==
=== Books ===
1. Tamang, J. P., ed. (2024). Microbiology and Health Benefits of Traditional Alcoholic Beverages. London: Elsevier. doi:10.1016/C2022-0-01452-5. ISBN 978-0-443-13322-0.
2. Tamang, J. P. (2020). Ethnic Fermented Foods and Alcoholic Beverages of India: Science History and Culture. Singapore: Springer Nature. ISBN 978-981-15-1486-9.
3. Tamang, J. P.; Lappe-Oliveras, P.; Mayo, B., eds. (2022). Insights of Fermented Foods and Beverages: Microbiology and Health-Promoting Benefits. Frontiers Research Topics. Lausanne: Frontiers Media SA. doi:10.3389/978-2-88974-440-4. ISBN 978-2-88974-440-4.
4. Tamang, J. P.; Holzapfel, W. H.; Felis, G. E.; Shin, D. H., eds. (2019). Microbiology of Ethnic Fermented Foods and Alcoholic Beverages of the World. Frontiers Research Topics. Lausanne: Frontiers Media. doi:10.3389/978-2-88963-165-0. ISBN 978-2-88963-165-0.
5. Tamang, J. P. (2016). Ethnic Fermented Foods and Alcoholic Beverages of Asia. New Delhi: Springer. ISBN 978-81-322-2798-4.
6. Tamang, J. P. (2015). Health Benefits of Fermented Foods and Beverages. New York: CRC Press, Taylor & Francis Group. ISBN 978-1-4665-88097.
7. Tamang, J. P. (2010). Himalayan Fermented Foods: Microbiology, Nutrition, and Ethnic Values. New York: CRC Press, Taylor & Francis Group. ISBN 9781420093247.
8. Tamang, J. P.; Kailasapathy, K., eds. (2010). Fermented Foods and Beverages of the World. New York: CRC Press, Taylor & Francis Group. ISBN 9781420094954.
9. Tamang, J. P. (2005). Food Culture of Sikkim. Sikkim Study Series. Vol. IV. Gangtok: Information and Public Relations Department, Government of Sikkim.

=== Articles ===
1. Tamang, J. P.; Das, S.; Lama, S.; Utama, G. L.; Safitri, R.; Balia, R. L.; Thapa, N. (2025). "Analysis of meta-transcriptomics and identification of genes linked to bioactive peptides and vitamins in Indonesian tempe". Food Research International. 202 115757. doi:10.1016/j.foodres.2025.115757. PMID 39967073.
2. Das, M.; Tamang, J. P. (2024). "Revealing the metagenome-assembled genomes in bemerthu, an Indian fermented soybean food for health benefits". Food Bioscience. 62 105280. doi:10.1016/j.fbio.2024.105280.
3. Tamang, J. P. (2024). "Unveiling kinema: blending tradition and science in the Himalayan fermented soya delicacy". Journal of Ethnic Foods. 11 (29) 29. doi:10.1186/s42779-024-00247-1.
4. Tamang, J. P.; Kharnaior, P.; Pariyar, P. (2024). "Whole genome sequencing of the γ-polyglutamic acid-producing novel Bacillus subtilis Tamang strain, isolated from spontaneously fermented kinema". Food Research International. 190 114655. doi:10.1016/j.foodres.2024.114655. PMID 38945588.
5. Tamang, J. P.; Kharnaior, P.; Halami, P. (2024). "Lactic acid bacteria in some Indian fermented foods and their predictive functional profiles". Brazilian Journal of Microbiology. 55 (2): 1745–1751. doi:10.1007/s42770-024-01251-y. PMC 11153396. PMID 38337126.
6. Tamang, J. P.; Kharnaior, P.; Das, M.; Sopheap, E.; Thapa, N. (2023). "Metagenomics and metagenome-assembled genomes analysis of sieng, an ethnic fermented soybean food of Cambodia". Food Bioscience. 56 103277. doi:10.1016/j.fbio.2023.103277.
7. Kharnaior, P.; Tamang, J. P. (2023). "Microbiome and metabolome in home-made fermented soybean foods of India revealed by metagenome-assembled genomes and metabolomics". International Journal of Food Microbiology. 407 110417. doi:10.1016/j.ijfoodmicro.2023.110417. PMID 37774634.
8. Das, S.; Tamang, J. P. (2023). "Metagenomics and metabolomics of toddy, an Indian fermented date palm beverage". Food Research International. 172 113205. doi:10.1016/j.foodres.2023.113205. PMID 37689952.
9. Shangpliang, H. N. J.; Tamang, J. P. (2023). "Genome analysis of potential probiotic Levilactobacillus brevis AcCh91 isolated from Indian home-made fermented milk product (chhurpi)". Probiotics and Antimicrobial Proteins. 16 (5): 1583–1607. doi:10.1007/s12602-023-10125-y. PMID 37466831.
10. Shangpliang, H. N. J.; Tamang, J. P. (2023). "Metagenomics and metagenome-assembled genomes mining of health benefits in Jalebi batter, a naturally fermented cereal-based food of India". Food Research International. 402 113130. doi:10.1016/j.foodres.2023.113130. PMID 37689895.
11. Shangpliang, H. N. J.; Tamang, J. P. (2023). "Metagenome-assembled genomes for biomarkers of bio-functionalities in Laal dahi, an Indian ethnic fermented milk product". International Journal of Food Microbiology. 402 110300. doi:10.1016/j.ijfoodmicro.2023.110300. PMID 37364321.
12. Kharnaior, P.; Tamang, J. P. (2023). "Probiotic properties of lactic acid bacteria isolated from the spontaneously fermented soybean foods of the Eastern Himalayas". Fermentation. 9 (5) 461. doi:10.3390/fermentation9050461.
13. Das, S.; Tamang, J. P. (2023). "Fermentation dynamics of naturally fermented palm beverages of West Bengal and Jharkhand in India". Fermentation. 9 (3) 301. doi:10.3390/fermentation9030301.
14. Tamang, J. P.; Lama, S. (2023). "Diversity of yeasts in Indian fermented foods and alcoholic beverages". FEMS Yeast Research. 21 foad011: 1–7. doi:10.1093/femsyr/foad011. PMID 36809779.
15. Kharnaior, P.; Das, M.; Tamang, J. P. (2023). "Therapeutic and anti-thrombotic properties of some naturally fermented soybean foods of the Eastern Himalayas". Fermentation. 9 (2) 91. doi:10.3390/fermentation9020091.
16. Lama, S.; Tamang, J. P. (2022). "Isolation of yeasts from some homemade fermented cow-milk products of Sikkim and their probiotic characteristics". Fermentation. 8 (12) 664. doi:10.3390/fermentation8120664.
17. Yilmaz, B.; Elibol, E.; Shangpliang, H. N. J.; Ozogul, F.; Tamang, J. P. (2022). "Microbial communities in home-made and commercial kefir and their hypoglycaemic properties". Fermentation. 8 (11) 590. doi:10.3390/fermentation8110590.
18. Pariyar, P.; Yaduvanshi, P. S.; Raghu, P.; Tamang, J. P. (2022). "Screening of Poly-glutamic acid (PGA)-producing Bacillus species from Indian fermented soybean foods and characterization of PGA". Fermentation. 8 (10) 495. doi:10.3390/fermentation8100495.
19. Tamang, J. P.; Annupma, A.; Shangpliang, H. N. J. (2022). "Ethno-microbiology of Tempe, an Indonesian fungal-fermented soybean food and Koji, a Japanese fungal starter culture". Current Opinion in Food Science. 48 100912. doi:10.1016/j.cofs.2022.100912.
20. Tamang, J. P. (2022). "Dietary culture and antiquity of the Himalayan fermented foods and alcoholic fermented beverages". Journal of Ethnic Foods. 9 30. doi:10.1186/s42779-022-00146-3.
21. Kharnaior, P.; Tamang, J. P. (2022). "Metagenomic–metabolomic mining of kinema, a naturally fermented soybean food of the Eastern Himalayas". Frontiers in Microbiology. 13 868383. doi:10.3389/fmicb.2022.868383. PMC 9106393. PMID 35572705.
22. Tamang, J. P.; Lama, S. (2022). "Probiotic properties of yeasts in traditional fermented foods and beverages". Journal of Applied Microbiology. 132 (5): 1–10. doi:10.1111/jam.15467. PMID 35094453.
23. Rai, R.; Tamang, J. P. (2022). "In vitro and genetic screening of probiotic properties of lactic acid bacteria isolated from naturally fermented cow-milk and yak-milk products of Sikkim, India". World Journal of Microbiology and Biotechnology. 38 (2) 25. doi:10.1007/s11274-021-03215-y. PMID 34989904.
24. Tamang, J. P.; Das, D.; Kharnaior, P.; Pariyar, P.; Thapa, N.; Jo, S. W.; Yim, E. J.; Shin, D. H. (2022). "Shotgun metagenomics of cheonggukjang, a fermented soybean food of Korea: community structure, predictive functionalities and amino acids profile". Food Research International. 151 110904. doi:10.1016/j.foodres.2021.110904. PMID 34980421.
25. Tamang, J. P. (2021). ""Ethno-Microbiology" of ethnic Indian fermented foods and alcoholic beverages". Journal of Applied Microbiology. 133 (1): 145–161. doi:10.1111/jam.15382. PMID 34821430.
26. Tamang, J. P.; Kharnaior, P.; Pariyar, P.; Thapa, N.; Lar, N.; Win, K. S.; Mar, A.; Nyo, N. (2021). "Shotgun sequence- based metataxonomic and predictive functional profiles of Pe poke, a naturally fermented soybean food of Myanmar". PLOS ONE. 16 (12) e0260777. Bibcode:2021PLoSO..1660777T. doi:10.1371/journal.pone.0260777. PMC 8682898. PMID 34919575.
27. Tamang, J. P.; Jeyaram, K.; Rai, A. K.; Mukherjee, P. K. (2021). "Diversity of beneficial microorganisms and their functionalities in community-specific ethnic fermented foods of the Eastern Himalayas". Food Research International. 148 110633. doi:10.1016/j.foodres.2021.110633. PMID 34507776.
28. Das, S.; Tamang, J. P. (2021). "Changes in microbial communities and their predictive functionalities during fermentation of toddy, an alcoholic beverage of India". Microbiological Research. 248 126769. doi:10.1016/j.micres.2021.126769. PMID 33873140.
29. Bhutia, M. O.; Thapa, N.; Tamang, J. P. (2021). "Prevalence of enterotoxin genes and antibacterial susceptibility pattern of pathogenic bacteria isolated from traditionally preserved fish products of Sikkim, India". Food Control. 125 108009. doi:10.1016/j.foodcont.2021.108009.
30. Shangpliang, H. N. K.; Tamang, J. P. (2021). "Phenotypic and genotypic characterizations of lactic acid bacteria isolated from exotic naturally fermented milk (cow and yak) products of Arunachal Pradesh, India". International Dairy Journal. 118 105038. doi:10.1016/j.idairyj.2021.105038.
31. Kharnaior, P.; Tamang, J. P. (2021). "Bacterial and fungal communities and their predictive functional profiles in kinema, a naturally fermented soybean food of India, Nepal and Bhutan". Food Research International. 140 110055. doi:10.1016/j.foodres.2020.110055. PMID 33648280.
32. Bhutia, M. O.; Thapa, N.; Shangpliang, H. N. K.; Tamang, J. P. (2021). "Metataxonomic profiling of bacterial communities and their predictive functional profiles in traditionally preserved meat products of Sikkim state in India". Food Research International. 140 110002. doi:10.1016/j.foodres.2020.110002. PMID 33648235.
33. Bhutia, M. O.; Thapa, N.; Tamang, J. P. (2021). "Molecular characterisation of bacteria, detection of enterotoxin genes and antibiotic susceptibility patterns in traditionally processed meat products of Sikkim, India". Frontiers in Microbiology. 11 599606. doi:10.3389/fmicb.2020.599606. PMC 7830132. PMID 33505372.
34. Pradhan, P.; Tamang, J. P. (2021). "Probiotic properties of lactic acid bacteria isolated from traditionally prepared dry starters of the Eastern Himalayas". World Journal of Microbiology and Biotechnology. 37 (1) 7. doi:10.1007/s11274-020-02975-3. PMID 33392833.
35. Bhutia, M. O.; Thapa, N.; Shangpliang, H. N. K.; Tamang, J. P. (2021). "High-throughput sequence analysis of bacterial communities and their predictive functionalities in traditionally preserved fish products of Sikkim, India". Food Research International. 143 109885. doi:10.1016/j.foodres.2020.109885. PMID 33992337.
36. Anupma, A.; Tamang, J. P. (2020). "Diversity of filamentous fungi isolated from some amylase and alcohol-producing starters of India". Frontiers in Microbiology. 11 905. doi:10.3389/fmicb.2020.00905. PMC 7272576. PMID 32547501.
37. Goel, A.; Halami, P. M.; Tamang, J. P. (2020). "Genome analysis of Lactobacillus plantarum isolated from some Indian fermented foods for bacteriocin production and probiotic marker genes". Frontiers in Microbiology. 11 40. doi:10.3389/fmicb.2020.00040. PMC 7000354. PMID 32063893.
38. Tamang, J. P.; Cotter, P.; Endo, A.; Han, N. S.; Kort, R.; Liu, S. Q.; Mayo, B.; Westerik, N.; Hutkins, R. (2020). "Fermented foods in a global age: east meets west". Comprehensive Reviews in Food Science and Food Safety. 19 (1): 184–217. Bibcode:2020CRFSF..19..184T. doi:10.1111/1541-4337.12520. hdl:1871.1/3532b203-3da9-458a-8085-37aa39987246. PMID 33319517.
39. Sha, S. P.; Suryavanshi, M. S.; Tamang, J. P. (2019). "Mycobiome diversity in traditionally prepared starters for alcoholic beverages in India by high-throughput sequencing method". Frontiers in Microbiology. 10 348. doi:10.3389/fmicb.2019.00348. PMC 6411702. PMID 30891011.
40. Shangpliang, H. N. K.; Rai, R.; Keisam, S.; Jeyaram, K.; Tamang, J. P. (2018). "Bacterial community in naturally fermented milk products of Arunachal Pradesh and Sikkim of India analysed by high-throughput amplicon sequencing". Scientific Reports. 8 (1) 1532. Bibcode:2018NatSR...8.1532S. doi:10.1038/s41598-018-19524-6. PMC 5784140. PMID 29367606.

== See also ==
- Food microbiology
- List of microorganisms used in food and beverage preparation
- List of fermented foods
- List of soy-based foods
