= Sikkim Institute of Science and Technology =

Engineering college in Chisopani, South Sikkim, India

- Type: Public
- Established: 2018; 8 years ago
- Academic affiliations: Sikkim University
- Director: Dr. B. B. Pradhan
- Location: Sikkim, India; 27.1478°N 88.3012°E
- Campus: Rural
- Website: https://sist.edu.in/

Sikkim Institute of Science and Technology (SIST), is a state government engineering college located at Chisopani, South Sikkim, India. It offers undergraduate (B.Tech.) engineering degree courses and is affiliated with the Sikkim University. The institution is regulated, operated, and administered by the Government of Sikkim. This college is the only state government engineering college in Sikkim.

== Departments and courses ==
The college offers different undergraduate courses in Engineering and aims at imparting technological education in Sikkim. Presently this college is offering B.Tech. degree courses via two departments:

- Computer Science and Engineering
- Civil Engineering

== Admission ==
The candidates are admitted on the basis of the class 12 marks.
