= PSA Phuentsholing Stadium =

Stadium in Phuntsholing, Bhutan

- Interactive map of PSA Phuentsholing Stadium
- Location: Phuntsholing, Bhutan
- Owner: Phuentsholing Sport Association (PSA)
- Capacity: 5,000
- Type: Sport venue
- Surface: Grass (until 2016); Artificial turf (2016–present)
- Field shape: Rectangular

Construction
- Opened: 2011

Tenants
- Phuentsholing Heroes (previously); Phuentsholing United FC (previously); Phuentsholing City FC (previously); Bhutan Clearing FC (previously); United Phuentsholing; Chukha District Football League; District Women Football Tournament

PSA Phuentsholing Stadium, also known as Phuentsholing Football Ground or PSA Ground, is a 5,000-capacity association football stadium located in Phuntsholing, Bhutan. The Bhutan Olympic Committee instigated a major sport venue construction project in 2016 which included the insertion of multiple additions to the stadium. Opened to the public in summer 2011, the field was previously prepared for paddy transplantations by the local footballers.

== Ground ==
It is the only recreational venue in Phuntsholing. For example, the annual inter-departmental football tournament start depends solely on the PSA Football Ground being ready for usage. Preparatory work on the stadium was needed as it was hosting an event to celebrate Bhutan's monarch, King Jigme Khesar Namgyel Wangchuck.

Hosting the 2011 Bhutan Monsoon Tournament, more fixtures were played irrespective of the rainfall reducing the pitch to a desolate field of uprooted grass roots which was a problem in the monsoon season. Artificial turf was built to supplant the sand pitch, costing a budget of 16.5 million Bhutanese ngultrums.

== Expansions ==
A facelift of the PSA Football Ground started in 2009 with a three-sided public gallery that could hold 5,000 spectators. A considerable sum of 9.8 million Bhutanese ngultrums was provided in assistance to the project from the Asian Development Bank. In 2017, a V-shaped drain was constructed as well as the laying of paved blocks. Around 90,000 ngultrums were paid to the contractors in accordance with the instruction to the bidders.
