= Daman people =

Daman people Chinese: 达曼人
Total population
- Total: 200 (2017 est.)

Regions with significant populations
- Tibet

Languages
- Tibetan, Chinese

Religion
- Buddhism

Related ethnic groups
- Gurung (Kerongee Lama), Tamang

The Daman people (Chinese: 达曼人) was one of the unrecognized ethnic groups in China and now officially classified as Tibetans. They are descendants of Nepalese centuries ago. Previously stateless, they were granted Chinese citizenship in 2003. Located around 30 kilometers away from the China-Nepal border in Gyirong County of Shigatse Prefecture, the Daman New Village, with a total population of 197, is the only settlement of the Daman people in China.

== Etymology ==
The term Daman is an exonym from Damag (Tibetan: རྟ་དམག, Wylie: rta dmag, THL: Tamak) in Tibetic languages, da means horse and man means soldier; hence, Daman means cavalryman.

== History ==
In 1792, after the Sino-Gorkha war, hundreds of Gorkha soldiers were lost in the China-Nepal border and then resided there. The Daman people are allegedly the descendants of the Gorkha soldiers, and there have been the 6th or 7th generations since then.

Daman people were once without a nationality (stateless) before the State Council of China officially approved them as Chinese citizens in 2003. Since then, Daman people have been treated the same as Tibetan by the government.

== See also ==
- Tamang people
