= St Joseph's College, Darjeeling =

College in West Bengal, India

Coordinates: 27°3′33.56″N 88°15′2.56″E

St. Joseph's College
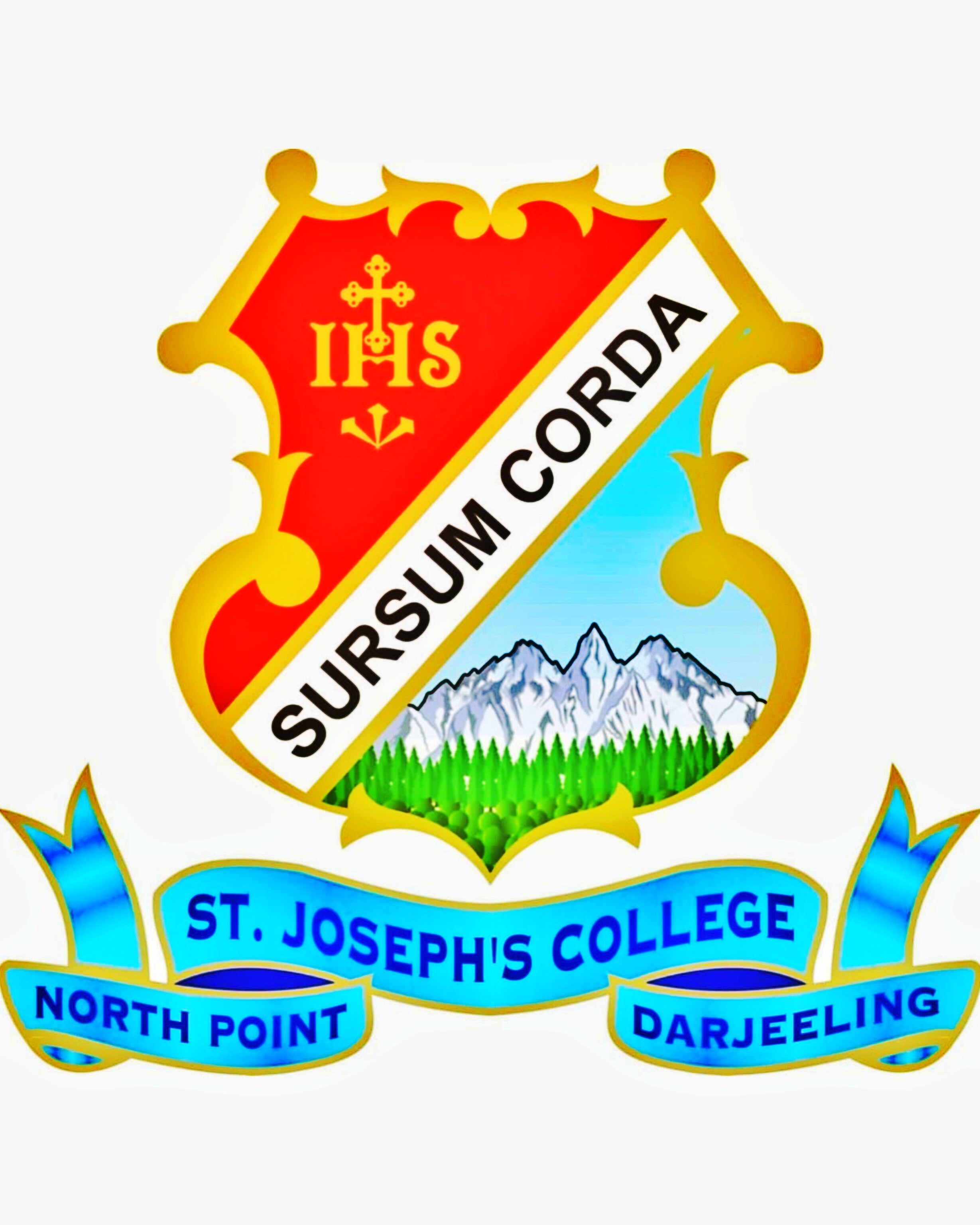
- Coat of arms
- Motto: Sursum Corda (Latin)
- Motto in English: Lift up your heart
- Type: Govt-Aided; Similarly Private College (Co-educational)
- Established: 1927; 99 years ago
- Founder: Society of Jesus
- Religious affiliation: Roman Catholic (Jesuit)
- Academic affiliations: University of North Bengal
- President: Rev. Fr. Shajumon Chakkalakal, S.J.
- Principal: Fr. (Dr.) Donatus Kujur, S.J.
- Location: Lebong Cart Rd, North Point, Darjeeling, West Bengal, 734104, India
- Campus: Urban
- Language: English
- Colors: Navy and sky blue
- Nicknames: North Pointers; Josephites
- Website: St.Josephs College

St. Joseph's College, Darjeeling, established in 1927, is a govt-aided and self financed, Christian minority, co-educational institution in West Bengal. Originally part of St. Joseph’s School (1888), it was first affiliated with the University of Calcutta, and since 1962, with the University of North Bengal. Run by the Darjeeling Jesuits, the college offers undergraduate and postgraduate programs.

== History ==
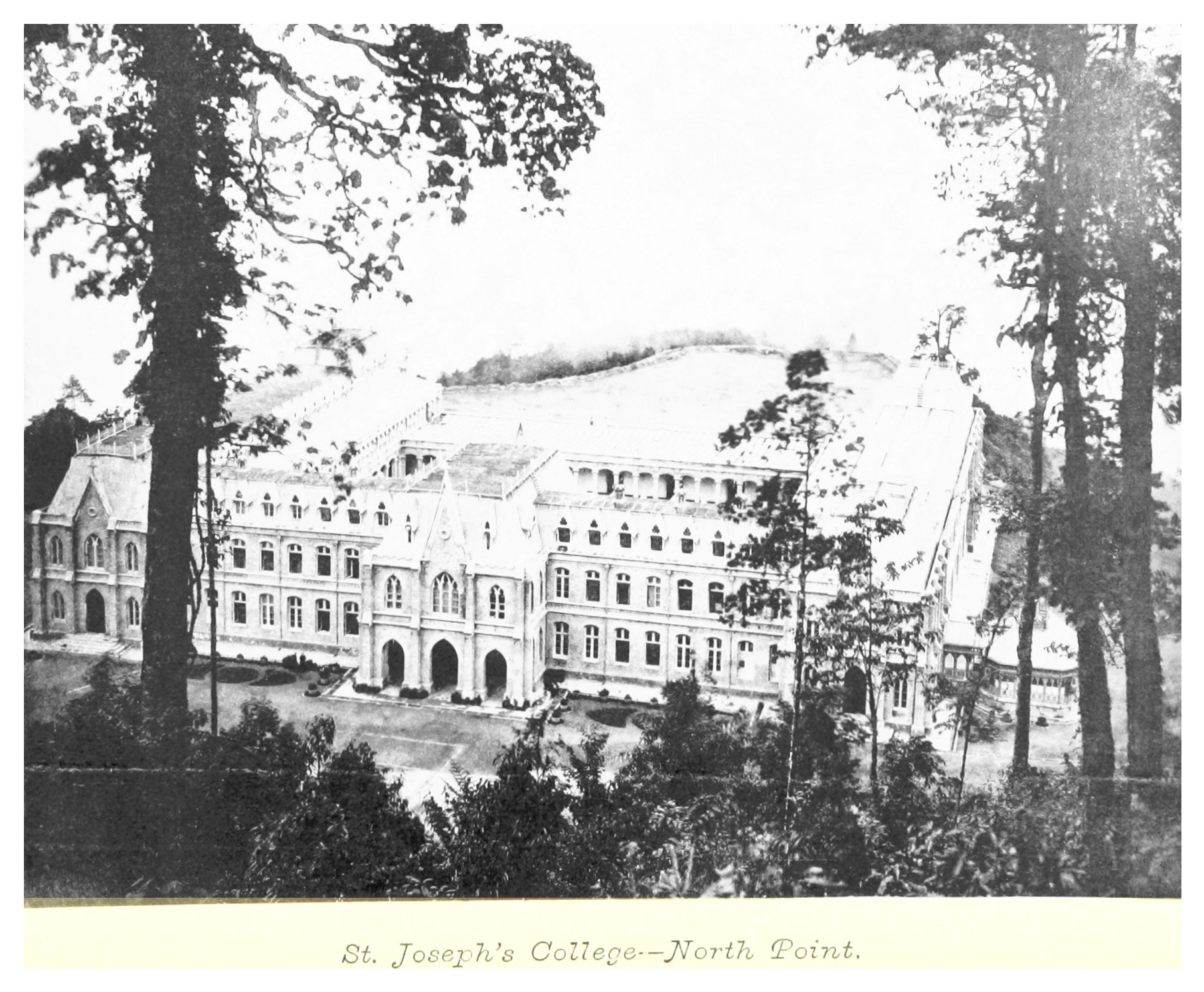
The college in 1894

In 1927 the college was affiliated to Calcutta University. By 1949 it was fully accredited to offer courses in B.A. and B.Sc. In 1962 with the establishment of the University of North Bengal the college was affiliated to that university. In 1963 St. Joseph's moved to new school premises at the present site. A master's degree in English has been offered since 2006.

== Academics ==
=== Departments ===
Departments
Faculty	Departments
Science	Botany, Chemistry, Computer Applications, Computer Science,Mathematics, Microbiology, Physics, Zoology
Humanities	English, Geography, Hindi, History, Nepali, Sociology, Political Science
Commerce	Accountancy, Economics, Management

== Notable alumni ==
- Mahendra P. Lama, Professor at Jawaharlal Nehru University, New Delhi and politician who contested 2009 Lok Sabha election from Darjeeling.
- Jyoti Prakash Tamang, food microbiologist and N-Bios laureate
- Danny Denzongpa, Indian film actor, singer, film director and businessman.
- Neiphiu Rio, 9th Chief Minister of Nagaland.
- Louis Banks, Indian film music composer, singer, record producer, keyboardist and musician.
- Gyanendra Shah, former 2 times King of Nepal.
- King Birendra, former King of Nepal.
- Paras Shah, former Crown Prince of Nepal and son of Gyanendra Shah.
- Jishnu Dev Varma, Governor of Maharashtra and former Deputy Chief Minister of Tripura.

== See also ==
- Chowrasta Darjeeling
- St. Joseph's School, Darjeeling
- List of institutions of higher education in West Bengal
- Education in India
- Education in West Bengal
- List of Jesuit sites

== Community and Clubs ==
The college also has many active clubs, which are aimed at building leadership, creativity and managerial qualities in students. A list of clubs and societies are mentioned below:

- National Cadet Corps (NCC)
- National Service Scheme (NSS)
- Games and Sports
- Placement and Career Guidance Cell
- Youth Against Trafficking Club
- Cultural Committee
- Nature Club
- Management Club
- Science and Research Club
- Art Club
- Media (Film, Photography and Videography) Club
- Information and Technology Club (ITC)
- Value Education Committee
- Current Affairs Forum (CAF)
- All India Catholic University Students Federation (AICUF)
- SC & ST Cell
- Commerce Club
- Rotaract Club
- Dance Club
- Music Club
