= Harkamaya College of Education =

- Motto: Learn to Live
- Type: Private college
- Established: 2003
- Founder: Dr. H. P. Chhteri
- Affiliations: NAAC, NCTE
- Academic affiliations: Sikkim University
- Principal: Dr. Rajesh Singh
- Director: Dr. H. P. Chhteri
- Location: 27.310°N 88.597°E
- Website: www.hcesikkim.org

Harkamaya College of Education is a private teachers' training college in Gangtok, Sikkim under Sikkim University. The college offers Bachelor of Education and Master of Education degrees.

== History of the College ==
The college was founded in 2003, and was initially affiliated to University of North Bengal in West Bengal, due to the absence of a Central University in Sikkim at the time. In 2006, the college became the first institution in the state of Sikkim to offer the Master of Education degree. After the establishment of a Central University in Sikkim, the college became affiliated to Sikkim University. The college gained NAAC accreditation in 2011.

== Accreditation ==
Harkamaya College of Education is accredited by the National Assessment and Accreditation Council (NAAC), and its degrees are awarded by Sikkim University. The college's B.Ed. and M.Ed. programmes are also recognized by the National Council for Teacher Education (NCTE).
