= Mahendra P. Lama =

Indian professor and a political analyst (born 1961)

- Born: 1 March 1961 (age 65); Darjeeling, India

Academic background
- Education: St Joseph's College, Darjeeling, Jawaharlal Nehru University

Academic work
- Discipline: Development economics
- Institutions: Jawaharlal Nehru University, Sikkim University
- Notable ideas: Education
- Awards: Ambassador for Peace, Schokaert Gold Medal in 1979

Mahendra P. Lama is an Indian professor and a development economist who was the pro-vice chancellor of IGNOU and the founding vice chancellor of Sikkim University in India. At the age of 45, he became the youngest vice chancellor of a National Central University in India. He recently superannuated as a senior Professor in the School of International Studies, Jawaharlal Nehru University, New Delhi after 34 years of service in this premier institution of Asia. He is presently Emeritus Chief Economic Adviser in the Government of Sikkim (Cabinet Minister Rank). This is his fourth stint as the Chief Economic Adviser. (2000-2004; 2005-2007, 2019–2024 and 2024 onward) and he also serves as a Senior Adviser in the International Centre for Integrated Mountain Development (ICIMOD) in Kathmandu. He was a Member of the Eminent Persons Group on Nepal-India Relations appointed by the Prime Ministers of India and Nepal. He also served as a Member of the prestigious National Security Advisory Board of the Government of India

== Education ==
Prof. Lama completed his graduation from St Joseph's College, Darjeeling and did his Masters and Ph.D. from Jawaharlal Nehru University, New Delhi. Lama has worked and published on issues related to cooperation and integration in South and South East Asia and on issues of trade, investment and energy cooperation, borders and border lands, sustainable development, natural resource management, national security, migration, refugees and human security in South Asia, the Himalayan Regions and China.

== Career ==
Prof. Lama had been Chairperson, Centre for South, Central, Southeast Asia and South West Pacific Studies at the School of International Studies, Jawaharlal Nehru University, New Delhi, Asia Leadership Fellow in Japan, Nehru Fulbright Fellow in USA, High End Expert at Sichuan University in China, a Ford Foundation Fellow at Notre Dame University, USA, and a Visiting Professor in Hitotsubashi University and Tsukuba University in Japan. and India –China Fellow at the New School University, USA. In 1997 and 2011, he was nominated by the Indian government to serve in the Independent Expert Group (1997-1999) and South Asia Forum (2011-2016) set up by the Summit Leaders, South Asian Association for Regional Cooperation (SAARC). He was bestowed full Professorship at the relatively young age of 39 by India’s premier Jawaharlal Nehru University. He was also a member of the National Committee for the Revamping of the North Eastern Council in 2004 and the National Committee on Sixth Schedule (2006) appointed by the Ministry of Panchayati Raj, Government of India and the national steering committee for the North East Vision document - 2020. Lama is an author. He has written and edited several books and scholarly articles and some of this works have been translated into Japanese, French and German Language.

== Recent engagements ==
He served as the Chairman of the "North East Regional Vision 2047" preparations team under the aegis of the North Eastern Council, Ministry of Development of the North Eastern Region and North East Development Finance Corporation (2024-2025)

He also led a high-level team of experts to study the borderland connectivity of India with Bangladesh, Bhutan, Myanmar and Nepal under the aegis of Ministry of External Affairs, Government of India and NEDFi, Assam (2022-2024).

And also headed a Study Team constituted by the Govt of Arunachal Pradesh to write the report on building the economic corridor through Pangsau Pass (Stilwell Road built during the Second World War) between Eastern Arunachal Pradesh (India) and Myanmar and also between Western Arunachal Pradesh and Eastern Bhutan (2023-2025)

He is the principal author of the 'North East Region Vision 2035' of NITI Aayog, New Delhi (2021).

He has been a member of the prestigious Interview Board for the all-India Civil Services Examinations conducted by the Union Public Service Commission and also at the state level in Public Service Commissions. He has also been in the jury of Sahitya Akademy Award and National Fellows Selection Committee of the Ministry of Culture, Government of India.

In the last few years, the President of India has nominated Lama to eight institutions of India as her/his representative. Lama has also been nominated by the University Grants Commission in various Review Committees of the Central and State Universities, as the Chairman of the Area Studies Programme and member Commonwealth Fellowship Selection Committee.

The architect of the reopening of the historic Nathu la trade route between Sikkim in India and Tibet Autonomous Region in China after 44 years in 2006, he is also a life member of a number of pioneering Nepali literary and cultural organizations in India. He has also served as the member of the Prime Minister's Task Force on Hill and Mountain Development under the aegis of National Planning Commission. He has been associated as a professional with the World Bank, Asian Development Bank, United Nations Development Programme, USAID, Australian Aid Agency, Asia Foundation, IDRC of Canada, Economic Research Institute of ASEAN and East Asia (ERIA) in Jakarta, UNESCAP, and ICIMOD in Kathmandu and many other international organisations. He was also assigned the task of reviewing the functioning of SAARC by Asian Development Bank and SACEPS since its inception. He regularly writes in prominent national dailies in India and South Asia including Hindu, Hindustan Times, Times of India, Telegraph, Statesman, Deccan Herald, Financial Express, Patriot, Tribune, Economic Times, DNA, Indian Express, and Kathmandu Post. He has been a widely read columnist and wrote 100 regular columns in Himal Khabar Patrika (Serophero), Annapurna Post, Kathmandu Post and Kantipur (Chuchurobata) of Nepal and Himalaya Darpan (Ghamko khoji) in Siliguri. He is also frequently interviewed by the top TV and radio channels around the world.

He has collaborated in various research projects with some of the most prominent institutions in South, South East Asia and Japan and China. He has been associated with a number of national and international organisations including New Delhi's India International Centre, University Grants Commission, Sahitya Academy, National Book Trust and Indian Council of World Affairs. He has delivered over 400 Special / Public Lectures in the institutions both in India and abroad including in premier global institutions like Yale University, Stanford University, Notre Dame University, New School University and National Défense College (India and Myanmar), to IFS probationers and a large number of universities and other institutions. He has participated in over 600 seminars and conferences both in India and in 42 countries.

His innovative ideation of China’s Trishul Approach in South Asia [China and South Asia : Changing Regional Dynamics, Rajiv Ranjan and Guo Changgang (Eds), Routledge, New York, 2021 ] and his recent article on “Understanding India’s China Dependence Syndrome” [India-China Dialogues Beyond Border; Swati Mishra and Ranjana Sheel (Eds), Springer, Delhi, 2023] have been widely discussed.

Prof Lama has worked with and blessed by the Father of Green Revolution in India Dr MS Swaminathan (2007-2012) and India’s Father of White Revolution Dr Verghese Kurien (1990-1992).

== Publications ==
=== Select books and monographs ===
His most recent work includes Policy Report on Strengthening Trade and Transport Connectivity in Eastern South Asia, Development Paper 25-20, UN-ESCAP and South and South West Asia Network on the SDGs (SANS) 2025;

“Studying South Asia at the School of International Studies”, International Studies, 62(1) 103–120, 2025; DOI: 10.1177/00208817251382324; journals.sagepub.com/home/isq

His recent popular writing included: “A General Promises Change Amid Instability: A Portrait Of Contemporary Myanmar”, India’s World, Volume 2 (Issue 5), May, 2026

Most recent book : "Oh Darjeeling" (in Nepali) published by Kitab Publishers, Kathmandu, Nepal, 2021

"Strategic Roadmap for Bringing Investors from South East Asia (CLMV & Thailand) to North East India: A Seed Project Approach", (Principal Author), North Eastern Development Finance Corporation Ltd (NEDFi), Guwahati, 2021

"Fledgling sub-regionalism in Eastern South Asia: Reasons for China’s shift towards Bilateralism in BCIM", Occasional Paper Series, Institute of Chinese Studies, New Delhi, 2021

“India, Pakistan and China: Matrices of Positive Stake-Holding, Inter-Dependence And Peace Building”, India - Pakistan Relations: The Past Decade 2009 - 2019, The Chao Track, Policy Brief, February, 2020

- Energising Connectivity between Northeast India and its Neighbours. Economic Research Institute for ASEAN and East Asia, Jakarta 2019, ISBN 978-602-5460-10-4.

"India and China : Rethinking Borders and Security", (co-authored with LHM Ling et al). University of Michigan Press, USA, 2016

- Globalisation and Cultural Practices in Mountain Areas: Dynamics, Dimensions, and Implications. Sikkim University Press, 2012, ISBN 8173872309, ISBN 9788173872303.
- Human Security in India: Discourse, Practices, and Policy Implications. Bangladesh Institute of International and Strategic Studies. 2010, ISBN 9848815287, ISBN 9789848815281.
- Gorkhaland Movement: Quest for an Identity. Department of Information and Cultural Affairs, Darjeeling Gorkha Hill Council, 1996.
- Sikkim Human Development Report 2001. Social Science Press, 2001, ISBN 8187358041, ISBN 9788187358046.
- Managing Refugees in South Asia: Protection, Aid, State Behaviour, and Regional Approach. Refugee and Migratory Movements Research Unit, University of Dhaka, 2000.
- Integrated Programme of Action in SAARC: Genesis, Evaluation, Constraints, and Rationale for Revamping. Research and Information System for the Non-Aligned and Other Developing Countries, 1999, ISBN 8171220711, ISBN 9788171220717.
- Thakur Chandan Singh: Makers of Indian Literature, Sahitya Akademi. 1997, ISBN 9788126003211.
- Regional Economic Cooperation in South Asia: A Commodity Approach. Society for Peace, Security & Development Studies, 1997.
- Sikkim: Society, Polity, Economy, Environment. Indus Publishing Company, 1994, ISBN 8173870136.

BBIN Initiatives: Options for Cross-Border Power Exchange, ORF Issue Brief No 137, Observer Research Foundation and Asia Foundation, New Delhi, 2016 "India-Nepal Peace and Friendship Treaty 1950: Implications for Indian Gorkhas and Policy Suggestions", Bharatiya Gorkha Parisnagh and Darjeeling Dooars United Development Foundation, Darjeeling, 2016 "Unravelling Inclusiveness in North East India : Lessons from the Experimentations of Indian Gorkhas"; Samata Annual lecture IV, SAMATA Foundation, Kathmandu, 2014 "SAARC 2015 : Expanding Horizons and Forging Cooperation in a Resurgent Asia : The Delhi Statement", (with Ambassador KK Bhargava) Fredrich Ebert Stiftung, New Delhi, 2007 "Pipelines and Powergrids for Peace", (with Rasul Bakhsh Rais, Quaid-I- Azam University, Islamabad), ICPI, Mumbai and King's College, London (2001) "New Perspectives on India-Nepal Relations" (with Kalim Bahadur), (Har-Anand Publications, New Delhi, 1995) "Economic Cooperation in the SAARC Region : Potential, Constraints and Policies", (with VR Panchamukhi et al.), (Interest Publications, Delhi, 1990) "Tea Plantation Workers in the Eastern Himalayas"‚ (with RL Sarkar), (Atma Ram and Sons, Delhi, 1986) "The Eastern Himalayas : Environment and Economy"‚(with RL Sarkar), (Atma Ram and Sons, Delhi, 1986) "The Economics of Indo-Nepalese Cooperation: A Study on Trade, Aid and Private Foreign Investment"‚ (Atma Ram and Sons, Delhi, 1985)
