= Phuentsholing City FC =

Bhutanese football club

Phuentsholing City
- Full name: Phuentsholing City Football Club
- Founded: 2012; 14 years ago
- Ground: PSA Phuentsholing Stadium
- Capacity: 5,000
- League: Bhutan Premier League Qualifiers

Phuentsholing City Football Club was a professional football club from Phuentsholing, Bhutan, based at the PSA Phuentsholing Stadium. It finished fifth in the inaugural season of the Bhutan National League. The club has been sponsored by the Penden Group of Companies.

== History ==
The first mention of Phuentsholing competing at any level in Bhutanese football was in 2000, when the club won the eight team "Inter-club league cum knockout-tournament", beating the Police team 1–0 in the final. The following season, they were meant to take part in a Super League, where they would host teams from around Bhutan following a qualifying tournament. However, even though the tournament was based in Phuentsholing, the club withdrew before the competition had even started. It is not clear whether these records are for the same team, since there is no record of a team from Phuentsholing competing in the A-Division since 2001 and the Bhutan Football Federation indicates that this club was founded in 2012. Phuentsholing City competed in the inaugural season of the Bhutan National League, finishing fifth out of six teams, ahead of Samtse, with three wins and a draw from ten games. The wins came against Samtse 2–1 and 1–0 as well as against Zimdra, with a point also gained away at Ugyen Academy. The club competed again the following season, but was less successful, this time finishing in last place out of the six competing teams, with a single win and a draw from ten games. The club's only victory came at home to Druk Pol, while they managed to win a point away in a 0–0 draw with Yeedzin. Despite the fact that there is no relegation from the National League, the club has not taken part in the 2014 season, with Bhutan Clearing being the sole club from Chukha District competing.
