= Sikkim University =

University in India

- Motto: Quest Knowledge Wisdom
- Type: Public Central University
- Established: 2007; 19 years ago
- Accreditation: NAAC
- Affiliations: UGC; AICTE
- Chancellor: Lt. Gen. (Dr.) D. B. Shekatkar, PVSM, AVSM, VSM (Retd.)
- Vice-Chancellor: Santanu Kumar Swain
- Rector: Governor of Sikkim
- Visitor: President of India
- Faculty: 163
- Students: 1,986
- Undergraduates: 267
- Postgraduates: 1,347
- Doctoral students: 372
- Location: Gangtok, Sikkim, India; 27°18′32″N 88°35′17″E
- Campus: Urban
- Website: www.cus.ac.in

Sikkim University is a central university established under an Act of Parliament of India. It is in Gangtok. The campus is expected to be built at Yangang in Namchi district, about 56 kilometres (35 mi) from Gangtok. Its first chancellor was M. S. Swaminathan; Mahendra P. Lama was the first vice chancellor. It has its jurisdiction over whole of the state of Sikkim.

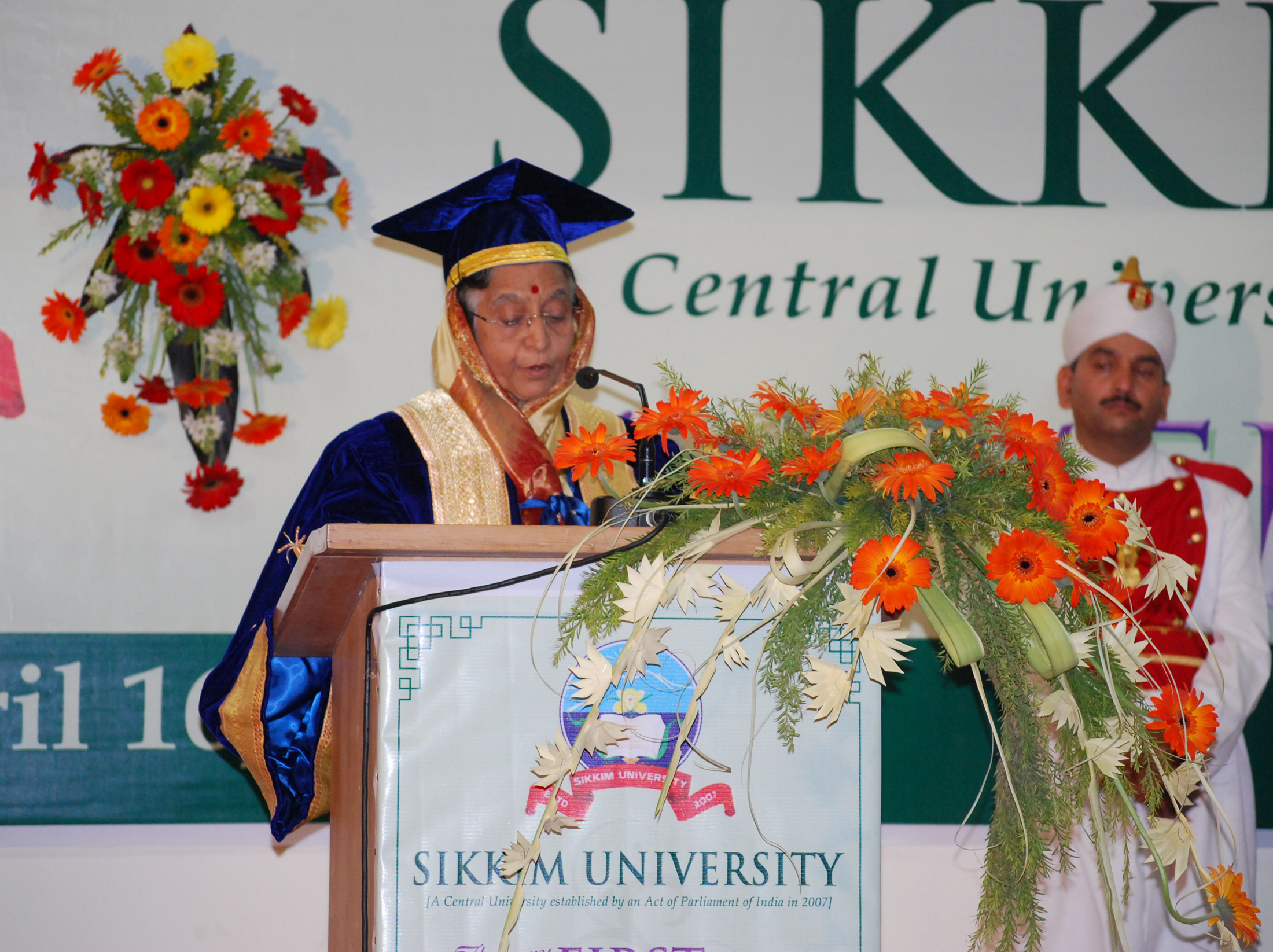
Pratibha Patil addressing in the first convocation of Sikkim University in 2010

In 2008 the university started from four departments — Social System and Anthropology; Peace and Conflict Studies and Management; International Relations/Politics; and Microbiology. The university offers traditional courses in humanities, physical and life sciences, and forestry along with non-traditional courses that are unique and related to the state including subjects like ethnic history, mountain studies, border studies, and hill music and culture.

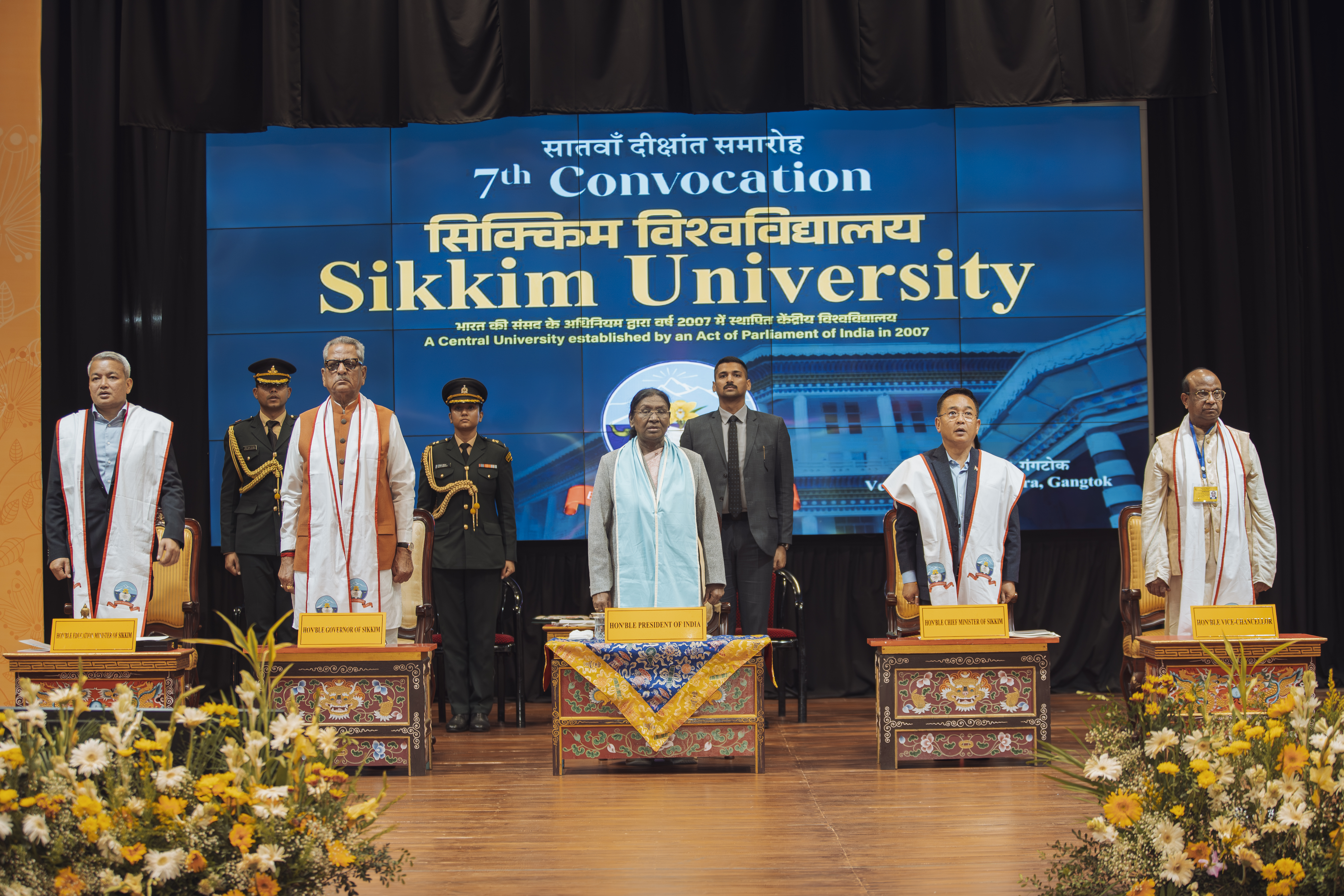
The President of India, Smt. Droupadi Murmu at 7th convocation ceremony of Sikkim University

All the colleges in the state of Sikkim are affiliated to this university.

== Affiliated Colleges ==
- Damber Singh College 6th Mile Samdur, Tadong, East Sikkim
- Government College Rhenock East Sikkim
- Government Vocational College, Dentam, West Sikkim
- Namchi Government College South Sikkim
- Government Arts College, Mangsila, North Sikkim
- Nar Bahadur Bhandari Government College, Tadong, East Sikkim
- Sikkim Government Law College Burtuk, East Sikkim
- Sikkim Government College Burtuk, East Sikkim
- Sikkim Government College, Gyalshing, West Sikkim
- Sikkim Govt. Science College Chakung, West Sikkim
- Harkamaya College of Education
- Loyola College of Education
- Sikkim Government B.Ed College
- Government Pharmacy College
- Himalayan Pharmacy Institute, Majhitar, East Sikkim
- Sikkim Government College of Nursing
- Namgyal Institute of Tibetology
- Sikkim Institute of Science and Technology

== Schools ==
The university has the following schools, departments and centres of studies:

- School of Social Sciences
  - Department of Economics
  - Department of History
  - Department of Law
  - Department of International Relations
  - Department of Political Science
  - Department of Sociology
  - Department of Peace and Conflict Studies and Management
- School of Life Sciences
  - Department of Botany
  - Department of Horticulture
  - Department of Microbiology
  - Department of Zoology
- School of Physical Sciences
  - Department of Chemistry
  - Department of Computer Applications
  - Department of Geology
  - Department of Mathematics
  - Department of Physics
- School of Languages and Literature
  - Department of Sikkimese
  - Department of Chinese
  - Department of English
  - Department of Hindi
  - Department of Lepcha
  - Department of Limbu
  - Department of Nepali
- School of Human Sciences
  - Department of Anthropology
  - Department of Geography
  - Department of Psychology
- School of Professional Studies
  - Department of Commerce
  - Department of Education
  - Department of Management
  - Department of Music
  - Department of Mass Communication
  - Department of Tourism
  - Department of Library and Information Science
